= National Treasure (North Korea) =

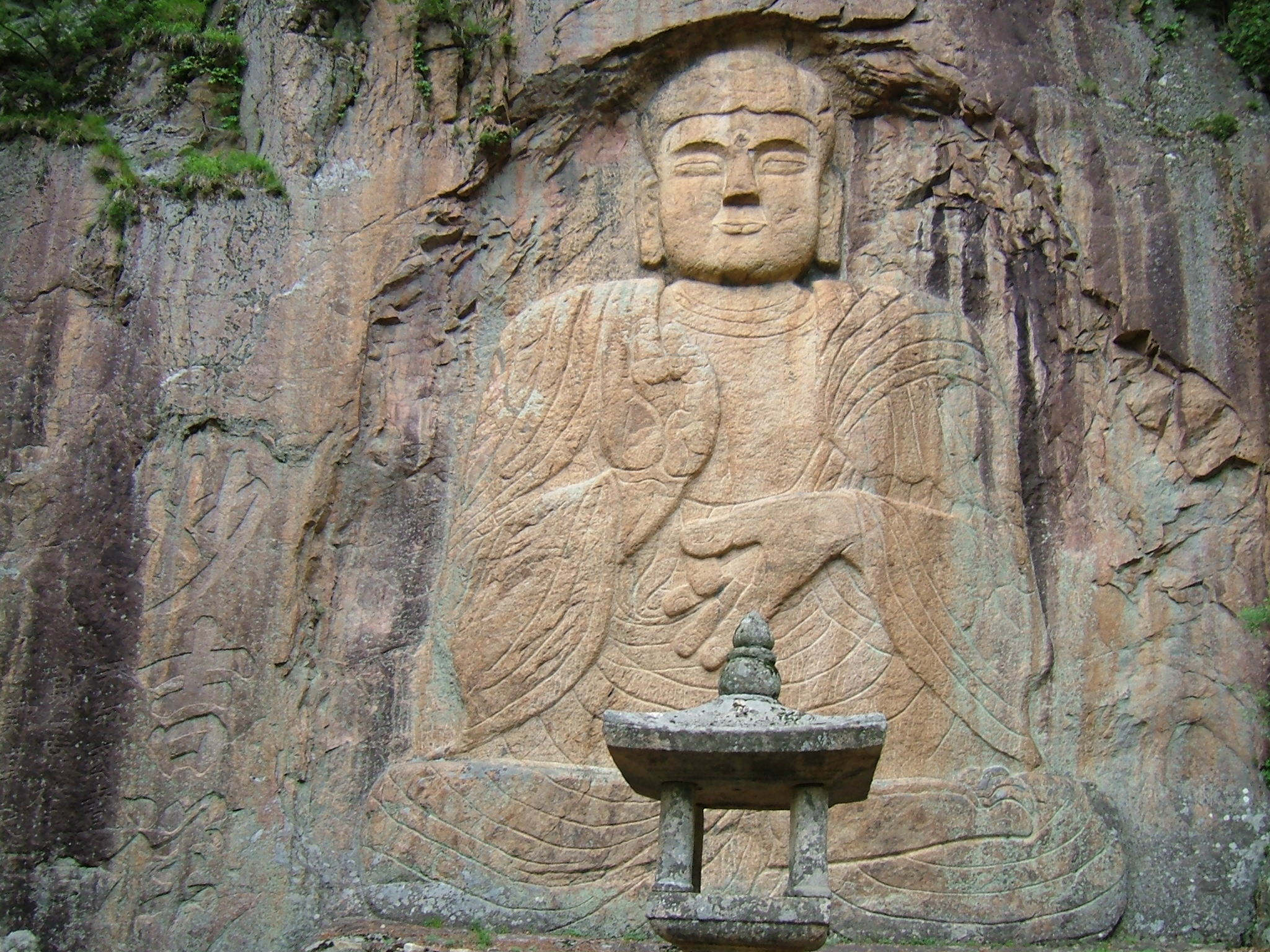
- The Myogilsang Buddhist statue on Mt. Kumgang, the 102nd Korean national treasure.

Korean name
- Hangul: 국보
- Hanja: 國寶
- RR: gukbo
- MR: kukpo

A National Treasure (Korean: 국보; Hanja: 國寶) is a tangible artifact, site, or building deemed by the Government of North Korea to have significant historical or artistic value to the country.

== History ==
The first list of Korean cultural treasures was designated by Governor-General of Korea in 1938 during the Japanese occupation with "The Act of Treasures of the Joseon dynasty".

== Nos. 1–50 ==
	Name	Location	Chosŏn'gŭl	Hancha	Image
1	Pyongyang Castle	Chung-guyok/Pyongchon-guyok, Pyongyang	평양성	平壤城	
2	Anhak Palace	Anhak-dong, Taesong-guyok, Pyongyang	안학궁	安鶴宮	
3	Potongmun	Potongmun-dong, Chung-guyok, Pyongyang	보통문	普通門	
4	Taedongmun	Taedongmun-dong, Chung-guyok, Pyongyang	대동문	大同門	
5	Sungin Hall	Jongro-dong, Chung-guyok, Pyongyang	숭인전	崇仁殿	
6	Sungryong Hall	Jongro-dong, Chung-guyok, Pyongyang	숭령전	崇靈殿	
7	Tabo Pagoda of Pohyonsa Buddhist temple	Hyangam-ri, Hyangsan-gun	보현사다보탑	普賢寺多寶塔	
8	Taesong Fortress	Taesong-guyok, Pyongyang	대성산성	大城山城	
9	Chongam-ri Earthen Castle	Chongam-ri, Taesong-guyok, Pyongyang	청암리토성	清巖里土城	
10	South Gate of Taesong Fortress	Taesong-guyok, Pyongyang	대성산성남문	大城山城南門	
11	Lotus-ponds of Mt. Taesong	Taesong-dong, Taesong-guyok, Pyongyang	대성산련못떼	大城山蓮池郡	
12	Group of Koguryo tombs on Mt. Taesong	Taesong-guyok, Pyongyang	대성산고구려고분군	大城山高句麗古墳群	
13	Pobun Hermitage of Yongmyongsa Buddhist temple	Ryongbong-ri, Mangyongdae-guyok, Pyongyang	영명사법운암	永明寺法雲庵	
14	Ryonggok Academy	Ryongbong-ri, Mangyongdae-guyok, Pyongyang	룡곡서원	龍谷書院	
15	Ryongsan-ri Koguryo Tombs	Ryongsan-ri, Chunghwa-gun, Pyongyang	룡산리고구려고분군	龍山里高句麗古墳群	
16	Ryongwang Pavilion	Taedongmun-dong, Chung-guyok, Pyongyang	련광정	練光亭	
17	Pubyok Pavilion	Moranbong Park, Pyongyang	부벽루	浮碧樓	
18	Chilsongmun	Moranbong Park, Pyongyang	칠성문	七星門	
19	Ulmil Pavilion	Moranbong Park, Pyongyang	을밀대	乙密臺	
20	Chongryu Pavilion	Moranbong Park, Pyongyang	청류정	清流亭	
21	Choesung Pavilion	Moranbong Park, Pyongyang	최승대	最勝臺	
22	Jongum Gate	Moranbong Park, Pyongyang	전금문	轉錦門	
23	Bell Pavilion & Pyongyang Bell	Taedongmun-dong, Chung-guyok, Pyongyang	평양종각	平壤鐘閣	
24	7-storied hexagonal pagoda of Hongboksa Buddhist temple	Moranbong Park, Pyongyang	홍복사6각7층탑	弘福寺六角七層塔	
25	Site of Kumgangsa Buddhist temple	Chongam-ri, Taesong-guyok, Pyongyang	금강사지	金剛寺址	
26	Honam-ri Four Spirits Tomb	Honam-ri, Samsŏk-guyŏk, Pyongyang	호남리사신총	湖南里四神塚	
27	Komun Moru ("Black Anvil") Stone Age ruins	Hoku-ri, Sangwon-gun, Pyongyang	상원검은모루유적	祥原검은모루遺蹟	
28	Kangso Three Tombs	Sammyo-ri, Kangso-gun	강서삼묘	江西三墓	
29	Yaksu-ri rock-paintings tomb	Yaksu-ri, Kangso-gun	약수리벽화고분	藥水里壁畵古墳	
30	Susan-ri rock-paintings tomb	Susan-ri, Kangso-gun	수산리벽화고분	修山里壁畵古墳	
31	Paeksang Pavilion	Dungbangsan-dong, Anju	백상루	百祥樓	
32	Kangson Pavilion	Songchon	강선루	降仙樓	
33	Hunryon Pavilion	Pyongwon	훈련정	訓鍊亭	
34	Anguksa Buddhist temple	Ponghak-dong, Pyongsong	안국사	安國寺	
35	Songchon Guest House	Songchon	성천객사	成川客舍	
36	Tomb of King Tongmyong	Ryongsan-ri, Ryokpo-guyok, Pyongyang	동명왕릉	東明王陵	
37	Hwangryong Fortress	Okdo-ri, Ryonggang-gun, Nampo	황룡산성	黃龍山城	
38	Jamo Fortress	Ochung-ri, Pyongsong	자모산성	慈母山城	
39	Twin Column Tomb	Ryonggang, Nampo	쌍영총	雙楹塚	
40	Pohyonsa Buddhist temple	Hyangam-ri, Hyangsan-gun	보현사	普賢寺	
41	Sangwon Hermitage	Hyangam-ri, Hyangsan-gun	보현사상원암	普賢寺上元庵	
42	Chuksong Hall	Hyangam-ri, Hyangsan-gun	보현사축성전	普賢寺祝聖殿	
43	Puryong Hermitage	Hyangam-ri, Hyangsan-gun	보현사불영암	普賢寺佛影庵	
44	South Gate of Kuju Castle	Tongmun-dong, Kusong	구주성남문	龜州城南門	
45	Changsong Provincial School	Changsong	창성향교	昌城鄕校	
46	Chonjusa Buddhist temple	Yongbyon	천주사	天柱寺	
47	Ryuksung Pavilion	Yongbyon	륙승정	六勝亭	
48	Koryo Changsong	Kumya-ri, Changsong-gun	고려장성	高麗長城	
49	Mannomun	Yongbyon	만노문	萬弩門	
50	Sounsa Buddhist temple	Yongbyon	서운사	棲雲寺	

== Nos. 51-100 ==
	Name	Location	Chosŏn'gŭl	Hanja	Image
51	Tonggun Pavilion	Uiju	통군정	統軍亭	
52	Uiju Castle	Uiju	의주읍성	義州邑城)	
53	Kumgwangsa Buddhist temple	Kumgwang-ri, Uiju	금광사	金光寺	
54	Simwonsa (Pakchon) Buddhist temple	Pakchon	박천심원사	博川深源寺	
55	Yanghwasa Buddhist temple	Sangdan-ri, Taechon-gun	양화사	陽和寺	
56	Ryongo-ri Fortress	Ryongsang-ri, Taechon-gun	룡오리산성	龍五里山城	
57	Kwanum Hall of Pohyonsa Buddhist temple	Hyangam-ri, Hyangsan-gun	보현사관음전	普賢寺觀音殿	
58	Paekmasan Fortress	Paekma Worker's District, Pihyon-gun	백마산성	白馬山城	
59	Sŏngdong-ri Dharani Monument	Sŏngdong-ri, P'ihyŏn-gun	성동리다라니석당	城東里陀羅尼石幢	
60	Kuju Castle	Kusong	구주성	龜州城	
61	Runghan Fortress	Kwaksan	릉한산성	陵寒山城	
62	Ryonggol Fortress	Pihyon-gun/Yomju-gun	룡골산성	竜骨山城	
63	Cholong Castle	Yongbyon	철옹성	鐵瓮城	
64	Inpung Pavilion	Chungsong-dong, Kanggye	인풍루	仁風樓	
65	Mangmi Pavilion	Pukchang-dong, Kanggye	망미정	望美亭	
66	Kanggye Magistrate's Office	Pukmun-dong, Kanggye	강계아사	江界衙舍	
67	Anak Tomb No.3	Oguk-ri, Anak-gun	안악3호분	安岳三號墳	
68	Puyong Hall	Puyong-dong, Haeju	부용당	芙蓉堂	
69	Haeju Sokbinggo (ice house)	Okgye-dong, Haeju	해주석빙고	海州石氷庫	
70	9-storied pagoda of Haeju	Haechong-dong, Haeju	해주9층탑	海州九層塔	
71	5-storied pagoda of Haeju	Okgye-dong, Haeju	해주5층탑	海州五層塔	
72	Site of Sunmyong Gate	Yonggwang-dong, Haeju	순명문테	順明門址	
73	Anak Tomb No.1	Taechu-ri, Anak-gun	안악1호분	安岳一號墳	
74	Anak Tomb No.2	Taechu-ri, Anak-gun	안악2호분	安岳二號墳	
75	Woljongsa Buddhist temple	Woljong-sa, Anak-gun	월정사	月精寺	
76	Noam-ri dolmen	Noam-ri, Anak-gun	노암리고인돌	路岩里支石墓	
77	Kangsosa Buddhist temple	Kangho-ri, Paechon-gun	강서사	江西寺	
78	Ryongdong-ri Dolmen	Ryongdong-ri, Paechon-gun	룡동리고인돌	龍東里支石墓	
79	Sohyon Academy	Sokdam-ri, Pyoksong-gun	소현서원	紹賢書院	
80	Chahyesa Buddhist temple	Sowon-ri, Sinchon-gun	자혜사	慈惠寺	
81	Hanging Hermitage of Myoumsa Buddhist temple	Sorim-ri, Chaeryong-gun	묘음사현암	妙陰寺懸庵	
82	Haeju Dharani Monument	Haechong-dong, Haeju	해주다라니석당	海州陀羅尼石幢	
83	Five-storied pagoda of Hakrimsa Buddhist temple	Hakrim-ri, Changyon-gun	학림사5층탑	鶴林寺五層塔	
84	Kwansan-ri Dolmen	Kwansan-ri, Unryul-gun	관산리고인돌	冠山里支石墓	
85	Monument to the Venerable Jinchol of Kwangjosa Buddhist temple	Hakhyon-dong, Haeju	광조사진철대사탑비	廣照寺眞澈大師塔碑	
86	Yonan Castle	Yonan	연안읍성	延安邑城	
87	Songbulsa Buddhist temple	Kwangsong-dong, Sariwon	성불사	成佛寺	
88	South gate of Jongbangsan Fortress	Jongbang-ri, Sariwon	정방산성	正方山城南門	
89	Jongbangsan Fortress	Jongbang-ri, Sariwon	정방산성	正方山城	
90	Monument to Commander Kim Song-op	Songmun-dong, Sariwon	성장김성업비	城將金成業碑	
91	Yontan Simwonsa Buddhist temple	Yontan	연탄심원사	燕灘心源寺	
92	Kwijinsa Buddhist temple	Songwol-ri, Sohung-gun	귀진사	歸眞寺	
93	Taebaeksan Fortress	Sansong-ri, Pyongsan-gun	태백산성	太白山城	
94	Sogwangsa Buddhist temple	Solbang-ri, Kosan-gun	석왕사	釋王寺	
95	Singyesa Buddhist temple	Onjong-ri, Kosan-gun	신계사	神溪寺	
96	Site of Changansa Buddhist temple	Naegang-ri, Kumgang-gun	장안사	長安寺址	
97	Pyohunsa Buddhist temple	Naegang-ri, Kumgang-gun	표훈사	表訓寺	
98	Podok Hermitage	Naegang-ri, Kumgang-gun	보덕암	普德庵	
99	Chongyangsa Buddhist temple	Naegang-ri, Kumgang-gun	정양사	正陽寺	
100	Lion Pagoda of Kumjang Hermitage	Naegang-ri, Kumgang-gun	금장암사자탑	金藏庵獅子塔	

== Nos. 101-150 ==
	Name	Location	Chosŏn'gŭl	Hanja	Image
101	3-storied pagoda of Changyonsa Buddhist temple	Naegang-ri, Kumgang-gun	장연사3층탑	長淵寺三層塔	
102	Myogilsang Buddhist statue	Naegang-ri, Kumgang-gun	묘길상	妙吉祥	
103	Kahak Pavilion	Anbyon	가학루	駕鶴樓	
104	Anbyon Pohyonsa	Yongsin-ri, Anbyon-gun	안변보현사	安邊普賢寺	
105	Myongjoksa Buddhist temple	Yongsam-ri, Wonsan	명적사	明寂寺大雄殿	
106	Chudun-ri Rainbow Bridge	Chudun-ri, Kosong-gun	주둔리무지개다리	駐屯里무지개다리	
107	Hamhung Royal Villa	Sonamu-dong, Hungnam-guyok, Hamhung	함흥본궁	咸興本宮	
108	Kuchon Pavilion of Hamhung Castle	Hamhung	함흥성구천각	咸興城九天閣	
109	Sonhwa Hall	Hamhung	선화당	宣化堂	
110	Monuments of King Chinhung (from Hwangcho Pass)	Sonamu-dong, Hungnam-guyok, Hamhung	황초령진흥왕순수비	黃草嶺眞興王巡狩碑	
111	Monuments of King Chinhung (from Maun Pass)	Sonamu-dong, Hungnam-guyok, Hamhung	마운령진흥왕순수비	摩雲嶺眞興王巡狩碑	
112	Chonggwangsa Buddhist temple	Wonsa-ri, Riwon-gun	정광사	定光寺	
113	Ryangchonsa Buddhist temple	Nakchon-ri, Kowon-gun	양천사	梁泉寺	
114	Kunja Pavilion	Kumya	군자루	君子樓	
115	Ryonghungsa Buddhist temple	Ponghung-ri, Yonggwang-gun	룡흥사	龍興寺	
116	Tongdoksa Buddhist temple	Tuyon-ri, Tanchon	동덕사	同德寺	
117	Kongmin Pavilion	Yangsan-dong, Tanchon	공민루	公民樓	
118	Kyongsong city walls	Sungam Worker's District, Kyongsong-gun	경성읍성	鏡城邑城	
119	Kyongsong South Gate	Sungam Worker's District, Kyongsong-gun	경성읍성남문	鏡城邑城南門	
120	Kaesimsa Buddhist temple	Pochon-ri, Myongchon-gun	개심사	開心寺	
121	Hwasong Ssanggyesa Buddhist temple	Puam-ri, Hwasong-gun	화성쌍계사	化城雙磎寺	
122	Manwoldae Palace	Songak-dong, Kaesong	만월대	滿月臺	
123	Tomb of King Kongmin (Hyonjongrung)	Haeson-ri, Kaepung-gun	공민왕릉 (현정릉)	恭愍王陵 (玄正陵	
124	Kaesong Namdaemun	Nammun-dong, Kaesong	개성남대문	開城南大門	
125	Kwanumsa Buddhist temple	Pakyon-ri, Kaesong	관음사	觀音寺	
126	Taehung Fortress	Pakyon-ri, Kaesong	대흥산성	大興山城	
127	Koryo Songgyungwan Confucian Academy	Pangjik-dong, Kaesong	고려성균관	高麗成均館	
128	Sungyang Academy	Sonjuk-dong, Kaesong	숭양서원	崧陽書院	
129	Defenses of the walled city of Kaesong	Kaesong	발어참성	拔禦塹城	
130	Outer wall of Kaesong Castle	Kaesong	개성나성	開城羅城	
131	Kaesong Chomsongdae Observatory	Songak-dong, Kaesong	개성첨성대	開城瞻星臺	
132	Pagoda of Hungguksa Buddhist temple	Koryo Museum, Kaesong	흥국사석탑	興國寺石塔	
133	Five-storied pagoda of Ryongtongsa Buddhist temple	Ryonghung-dong, Kaesong	령통사5층탑	靈通寺五層塔	
134	Stupa of Hwajangsa Buddhist temple	Ryonghung-dong, Kaesong	화장사부도	華藏寺浮屠	
135	5-storied pagoda of Pulilsa Buddhist temple	Koryo Museum, Kaesong	불일사5층탑	佛日寺五層塔	
136	Bell of Yonbok Temple (im Namdaemun)	Nammun-dong, Kaesong	연복사종	演福寺鐘	
137	Iron Buddha of Jokjo Temple	Koryo Museum, Kaesong	적조사쇠부처	寂照寺鐵佛陀	
138	Pyochung Pavilion	Sonjuk-dong, Kaesong	표충단	表忠壇	
139	7-storied pagoda of Hyonhwasa Buddhist temple	Koryo Museum, Kaesong	현화사7층탑	玄化寺七層塔	
140	Carved letters of Koguryo	Pyongyang		글자 새긴 성돌	
141	Ryongsan Hall of Pohyonsa Buddhist temple	Hyangam-ri, Hyangsan-gun	보현사령산전	普賢寺靈山殿	
142	House of Kim Ung-so	Okdo-ri, Ryonggang-gun, Nampo	김응서집	金應瑞집	
143	Suchung Shrine	Hyangam-ri, Hyangsan-gun	수충사	酬忠祠	
144	Sokka Pagoda of the Pohyonsa Buddhist temple	Hyangam-ri, Hyangsan-gun	보현사석가탑	普賢寺釋迦塔	
145	Kyongam Pavilion	Kyongam-dong, Sariwon	경암루	景巖樓	
146	Site of Chilryolsa Buddhist temple	Anju	칠렬사지	七烈寺址	
147	Banner pillars of Chunghungsa Buddhist temple (formerly known as "Kija's pillars")	Inhung-dong, Moranbong-guyok, Pyongyang	중흥사당간지주	重興寺幢竿支柱	
148	Octagonal stone shrine of Yongmyongsa Buddhist temple	Moranbong Park, Pyongyang	영명사8각석불감	永明寺八角石佛龕	
149	Monument of Pohyonsa Buddhist temple	Hyangam-ri, Hyangsan-gun	보현사비	普賢寺碑	
150	Kwangjesa Buddhist temple	Chuksang-ri, Pukchong-gun	광제사	廣濟寺	

== Nos. 151-193 ==
	Name	Location	Chosŏn'gŭl	Hanja	Image
151	Monument of Hyonhwasa Buddhist temple	Koryo Museum, Kaesong	현화사비	玄化寺碑	
152	Monument of Kwangtong Pojesonsa Buddhist temple	Haeson-ri, Kaepung-gun	광통보제선사비	廣通普濟禪寺碑	
153	Monument to Popgyong Taesa of Oryongsa Buddhist temple	Ryonghung-ri, Kaesong	오룡사법경대사비	五龍寺法鏡大師碑	
155	Monument to Taegak Guksa of Ryongtongsa Buddhist temple	Ryonghung-ri, Kaesong	령통사 대각국사비	靈通寺大覺國師碑	
156	Marble Avalokitesvara statue of Kwanumsa Buddhist temple	Pakyon-ri, Kaesong	관음사대리석관음보살상	觀音寺大理石觀音菩薩像	
157	Chinbuk Pavilion	Kapsan	진북루	鎭北樓	
158	Anju Castle	Anju	안주성	安州城	
159	Sonjuk Bridge	Sonjuk-dong, Kaesong	선죽교	善竹橋)	
160	Wooden bridge of the Koguryo Era	Chongho-dong, Taesong-guyok/Hyuam-dong, Sadong-guyok, Pyongyang	고구려나무다리	高句麗나무다리	
161	Tokhwa-ri Tomb No. 1	Tokhwa-ri, Taedong-gun	덕화리1호분	德花里一號墳	
162	Bell of Yujomsa Buddhist temple	Hyangam-ri, Hyangsan-gun	유점사종	楡岾寺鐘	
163	Ryonghwasa Buddhist temple	Kaeson-dong, Moranbong-guyok, Pyongyang	룡화사	龍華寺	
164	Kwangbopsa Buddhist temple	Taesong-dong, Taesong-guyok, Pyongyang	광법사	廣法寺	
170	Stone Lantern of Chahyesa Buddhist temple	Sowon-ri, Sinchon-gun	자혜사석등	慈惠寺石燈	
171	Paeyopsa Buddhist temple	Paeyop-ri, Anak-gun	패엽사	貝葉寺	
172	Koguryo well in Kosan-dong	Kosan-dong, Taesong-guyok, Pyongyang	고산동우물	高山洞우물	
173	Chongrungsa Buddhist temple	Ryongsan-ri, Ryokpo-guyok, Pyongyang	정릉사	定陵寺	
174	Mausoleum of Tangun	Munhung-ri, Kangdong-gun	단군릉	檀君陵	
175	Ryongsan-ri dolmen	Songchon-gun	룡산리고인돌	龍山里支石墓	
176	Hoji Gate of Sogwangsa Buddhist temple	Solbong-ri, Kosan-gun	석왕사호지문	釋王寺護持門	
177	Three Stone Buddhas relief of Anyang Hermitage	Onjong-ri, Kosong-gun	안양암마애3존불상	安養庵磨崖三尊佛像	
178	Onjong-ri Buddha	Onjong-ri, Kosong-gun	온정리마애불입상	溫井里庵磨崖佛立像	
179	Tomb of King Wanggon (Hyonrung)	Haeson-ri, Kaepung-gun	왕건왕릉 (현릉)	王建王陵 (顯陵)	
180	Jinpari Tomb No. 4	Ryongsan-ri, Ryokpo-guyok, Pyongyang	진파리4호분	眞坡里四號墳	
181	Jinpari Tomb No. 1	Ryongsan-ri, Ryokpo-guyok, Pyongyang	진파리1호분	眞坡里一號墳	
182	Hyangdan-ri Tomb	Namdang Worker's District, Kangdong-gun, Pyongyang	향단리돌관무덤	향단里突貫무덤	
183	Hwangdaesong Dolmen	Namdang Worker's District, Kangdong-gun, Pyongyang	황대성과고인돌	黃岱城과고인돌	
184	7-storied octagonal pagoda of Chongrungsa Buddhist temple	Ryongsan-ri, Ryokpo-guyok, Pyongyang	정릉사8각7층탑	定陵寺八角七層塔	
185	5-storied pagoda of Kwangbopsa Buddhist temple	Taesong-dong, Taesong-guyok, Pyongyang	광법사5층석탑	廣法寺五層塔	
186	3-storied pagoda of Chongyangsa Buddhist temple	Naegang-ri, Kumgang-gun	정양사3층탑	正陽寺三層塔	
187	Site of Chonghae Earthen Castle	Haho-ri, Pukchong-gun	청해토성지	靑海土城址	
193	Pukkwan Victory Monument	Rimmyong-ri, Kimchaek	북관대첩비	北關大捷碑	Replica in Gyeongbokgung

== See also ==
- Cultural assets of North Korea
- Natural monuments of North Korea
- National Treasure (South Korea)
- Complex of Koguryo Tombs
- History of Korea
- Culture of Korea
- List of World Heritage Sites in Asia#North Korea (1)
