= List of World Heritage Sites in North Korea =

Location of World Heritage Sites in North Korea

The United Nations Educational, Scientific and Cultural Organization (UNESCO) World Heritage Sites are places of importance to cultural or natural heritage as described in the UNESCO World Heritage Convention, established in 1972. Cultural heritage consists of monuments (such as architectural works, monumental sculptures, or inscriptions), groups of buildings, and sites (including archaeological sites). Natural heritage is defined as physical and biological formations, geological and physiographical formations (including habitats of threatened flora and fauna), and sites which are important from the point of view of scientific research, conservation or natural aesthetic.

North Korea, officially the Democratic People's Republic of Korea, ratified the convention on 21 July 1998, making its sites eligible for inclusion on the list. As of 2025, North Korea has three sites on the list: the Complex of Koguryo Tombs, inscribed in 2004; Historic Monuments and Sites in Kaesong, in 2013; and Mount Kumgang – Diamond Mountain from the Sea, in 2025. In addition, the North Korean government has put four sites on its tentative list on 25 May 2000, meaning they intend to nominate them as World Heritage Sites sometime in the future. In February 2023, a proposal to update the list was approved.

== World Heritage Sites ==
UNESCO lists sites under ten criteria; each entry must meet at least one of the criteria. Criteria i through vi are cultural, and vii through x are natural.

World Heritage Sites
Site	Image	Location	UNESCO data	Year listed	Description
Complex of Koguryo Tombs	Mural of a general	Pyongyang and Nampo	1091; i, ii, iii, iv (cultural)	2004	This is a complex of 30 tombs which dates back between the 3rd century BC to 7th century AD, during the final period of the Goguryeo kingdom; it was theorized these tombs were for kings, Go dynasty members, and aristocrates. The inscribed site covers 234.73 hectares (580.0 acres). Each tombs are decorated with paintings that provide a glimpse to the culture of its era. It was conserved by UNESCO to prevent potential decay and erosion from tourism and management systems.
Historic Monuments and Sites in Kaesong	An old city gate	Kaesong	1278rev; ii, iii (cultural)	2013	Located in the southern part of North Korea, former capital Kaesong has 12 monuments and sites which date back to the 10th and 14th centuries, during the Goryeo dynasty. They include palaces, institutional buildings, graveyards, defense walls and gates, an astronomy and meteorology observatory, steles, and two schools. Its designs, as well as the city's geomantic layout, reflect the area's transition from Buddhism to neo-Confucianism, as well as the cultural assimilation between states.
Mount Kumgang – Diamond Mountain from the Sea	A body of water in the mountains	Kangwon Province	1642; iii, vii (mixed)	2025	Also divided into Inner, Outer, and Sea, Kumgang has around 1,200 waterfalls and ponds. It harbors a variety of fauna, as well as flora native to North Korea and temperate and subarctic regions. Many of its cultural landscape elements are Buddhist, like the Pyohunsa temple and Podok Hermitage, as well as statues of figures like Myogilsang and Sambulam.

== Tentative list ==
In addition to sites inscribed on the World Heritage List, member states can maintain a list of tentative sites that they may consider for nomination. Nominations for the World Heritage List are only accepted if the site was previously listed on the tentative list.

World Heritage Sites
Site	Image	Location (province)	UNESCO data	Year listed	Description
Caves in Kujang Area	Interior of a cave	Kujang County, North Pyongan Province	1426; vii, viii, ix (natural)	2000	This site comprises three underground grottos, which are karstic and formed by limestones sometime during the Quaternary period. Its differing formations rely on the state of its stalagmites and stalactites. Ryongmun is unique for its network of 20 branches; Paekryong for its rock artworks and speleothem; and Songam for its flower-shaped stone formations.
Historical Relics in Pyongyang	A white mausoleum with a tiger statue	Pyongyang	1424; i, ii, iii, iv, vi (cultural)	2000	Pyongyang's existence dates back to the Paleolithic, Neolithic, and Bronze Age, as well as the Goguryeo, Goryeo, and Yi dynasties. This site includes the Tomb of King Tangun; castles like Hwangdae and Chongamdong Earthen; villages like Namgyong and Pyodae, as well as several dolmens. There is also Anhak Palace, Goguryeo's royal house; the Jangan and Taesong Fortresses; the Sungryong and Sungin Hall; a pagoda at the Yongmyong Temple; as well as Confucian and stone buildings.
Mt. Chilbo	A mountain with rocky terrain	North Hamgyong Province	1427; vii, viii, ix (natural)	2000	Erosions caused by igneous rocks from the Paektu Mountain formed Mt. Chilbo, hence its diversity of rocks. It is also the habitat of around 750 plant species, 20 mammals, 40 birds, and 10 reptiles. There are also 11 natural monuments already valued and protected by the North Korean government. The mountain is divided into Inner (featuring "harmonious" looking rocks), Outer (featuring "brisk" rocks), and Sea Chilbo (featuring "curious" rocks, spanning 40 kilometres (25 miles)).
Mt. Myohyang and the Relics in and around the Mountain	A forest with diverse flora and a traditional house	North Pyongan Province	1422; Mixed	2000	This site comprises mountain ranges with peaks up to 1,900 metres (6,200 feet) above sea level. Combined with the sweet smell of its plants' woods, Myohyang has been dubbed "the mountain of curiosity, beauty and sweet smell". It has 20 Buddhist temples, like Pohyonsa; there is also the preserved Archives of the 80,000 Wooden Blocks of the Complete Collection of Buddhist Sutras, dated the 13th century.
Coastal Wetlands in Mundok	Yalu_river_near_jian_2011_07_24	Mundok County, North Pyongan Province	6963; x (natural)	2000	These wetlands together total over 10,000 ha of intertidal mudflats, estuarine waters, reed beds, rice paddies, salt pans and collapsed plots. This is a significant stopover area along the East Asian–Australasian Flyway for 131 species of migratory water birds annually.

== See also ==
- Culture of North Korea
- Environment of North Korea
- Religion in North Korea
