= Kuju =

Kuju may refer to:

- Kuju, Ramgarh, a town in Ramgarh district, Jharkhand, India
- Kuju, Ardabil, a town in Iran
- Kujū, Ōita, a town in Ōita Prefecture, Japan
- Mount Kujū, a mountain in Kyushu Island, Japan
- Kuju Castle, a military fortress from the Goryeo period, in Kusong, North Korea
- Kuju Entertainment, a video game company

== People with the name ==
- Kuju Mai, title character of Mai, the Psychic Girl
