= Chung-guyok =

District of Pyongyang, North Korea

- Guyok of Pyongyang

Korean transcription(s)
  - Hangul: 중구역
  - Hanja: 中區域
  - Revised Romanization: Jung-guyeok
  - McCune–Reischauer: Chung-guyŏk
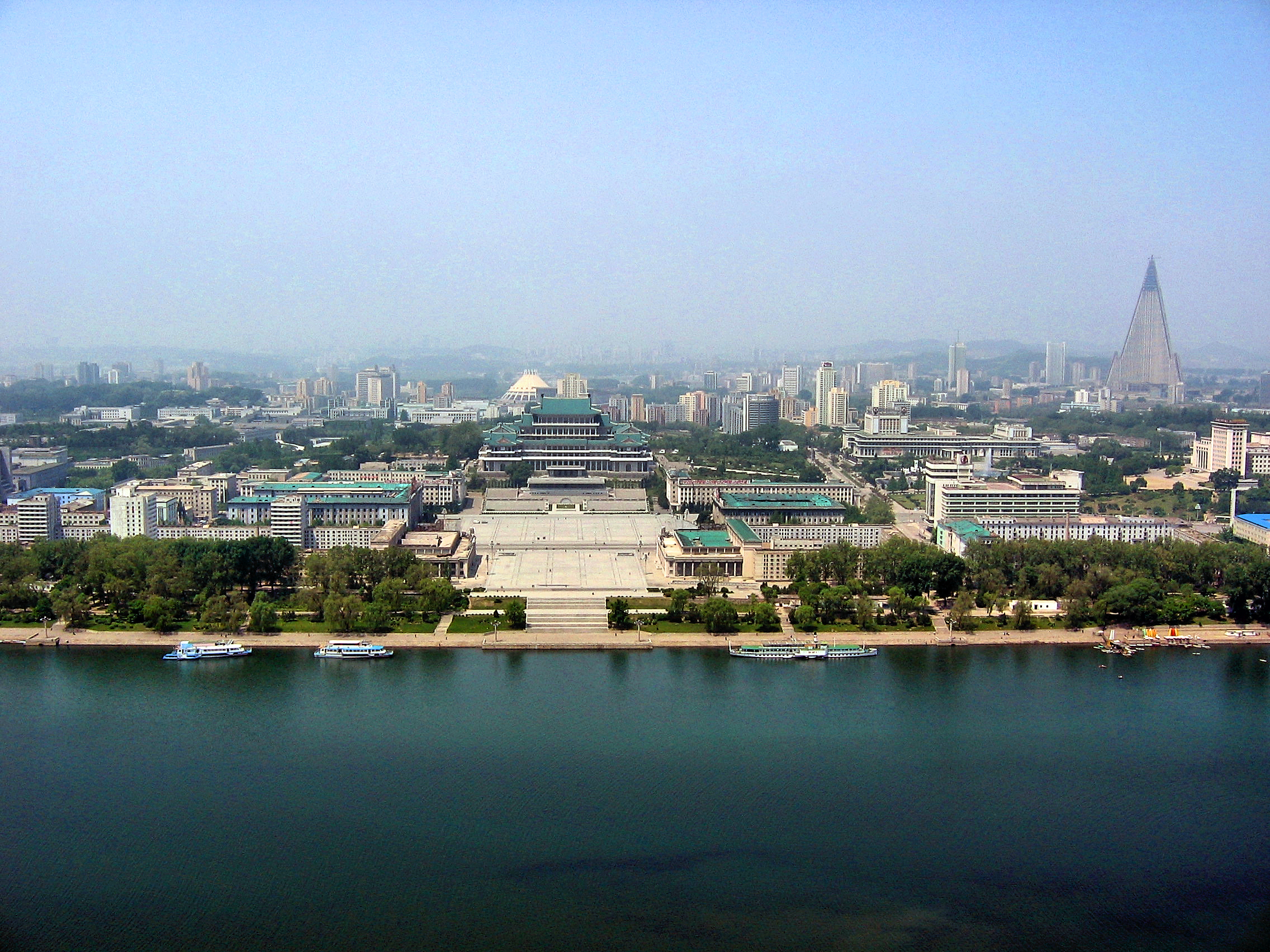
- The Grand People's Study House and Kim Il-sung Square (with Ryugyong Hotel in background)
- Interactive map of Chung-guyok
- Location within North Korea Location within Asia
- Coordinates: 39°00′00″N 125°44′24″E
- Country: North Korea
- Direct-administered city: Pyongyang-Chikhalsi
- Administrative divisions: 19 administrative dong

Area
  - Total: 13.1 km^{2} (5.1 sq mi)

Population (2008)
  - Total: 131,333
  - Density: 10,000/km^{2} (26,000/sq mi)

Chung-guyok (Korean: 중구역; lit. 'Central District') is one of the 19 guyok which constitute the city of Pyongyang, North Korea. The district is located in the center of the city, between the Pothonggang Canal and Taedong River, and is bordered to the north by Moranbong-guyok, to the northwest by Potonggang-guyok, and to the south by Pyongchon-guyok.

== Overview ==
As the centre of Pyongyang, the district holds many of the city's most important buildings. The famous Kim Il-sung Square is located along the banks of the Taedong river, together with the Grand People's Study House, which is the national library of North Korea. Chung-guyok was once the historical centre of Pyongyang, and was almost completely obliterated during the Korean War by American bombing. Vestiges of the old city can still be seen, and the district is home to several of North Korea's National Treasures, including the rebuilt Potong and Taedong Gates, the Pyongyang Bell, the Ryongwang Pavilion, and the Sungryong and Sungin Halls. Other buildings include the Koryo Hotel, Taedonggang Hotel, Pyongyang First Department Store, the Korea Stamp Museum, the Pyongyang Central Children's palace and Taedongmoon Cinema.

The Pyongyang Metro runs through this district, with stops at Yonggwang, Ponghwa and Sungri stations. Pyongyang's central railway station is also located here.

Executive offices of the North Korean government and its industry are located in the area. The headquarters of the Workers' Party of Korea and the headquarters of the Central Committee of the Workers' Party of Korea are located in the area.

Many new riverside terraced apartments were built along the Pothonggang Canal, a project which Kim Jong-un visited multiple times, and the district was renamed by the 690th order of the Presidium of the SPA.

== Economy ==
Air Koryo has a booking office in Tongsŏng-dong.

== Administrative divisions ==
Chung-guyok is divided into nineteen administrative districts known as dong.

	Chosŏn'gŭl	Hancha
Ch'anggwang-dong	창광동	蒼光洞
Chongro-dong	종로동	鍾路洞
Chungsŏng-dong	중성동	中城洞
Haebangsan-dong	해방산동	解放山洞
Kyogu-dong	교구동	橋口洞
Kyŏngrim-dong	경림동	敬臨洞
Kyongru-dong	경루동	瓊樓洞
Kyŏngsang-dong	경상동	慶上洞
Mansu-dong	만수동	萬壽洞
Oesŏng-dong	외성동	外城洞
Ot'an-dong	오탄동	烏灘洞
Pot'ongmun-dong	보통문동	普通門洞
Ryŏnhwa-dong	련화동	蓮花洞
Ryusŏng-dong	류성동	柳城洞
Sŏch'ang-dong	서창동	西蒼洞
Sŏmun-dong	서문동	西門洞
Taedongmun-dong	대동문동	大同門洞
Tong'an-dong	동안동	東岸洞
Tonghŭng-dong	동흥동	東興洞
Tongsŏng-dong	동성동	東城洞
Yŏkchŏn-dong	역전동	驛前洞
