= Mannomun =

South gate of Nyongbyon, North Korea

- Hangul: 만노문
- Hanja: 萬弩門
- RR: Mannomun
- MR: Mannomun

Manno Gate (Korean: 만노문) is the old south gate of the county of Yŏngbyon. Dating to the Joseon Dynasty, the gate was first constructed in 1658, and later rebuilt in 1789. Once guarding the road to Pyongyang, it bears a striking similarity to Pyongyang's Taedong Gate. It features a granite base topped by a two-story pavilion, the upper part of which bears a sign marking the gate as the old Yŏnju Castle Gate (古延州城門).

== See also ==
- National Treasures of North Korea
