= Ryongwang Pavilion =

Pavilion in Pyongyang, North Korea

Coordinates: 39°01′24″N 125°45′26″E

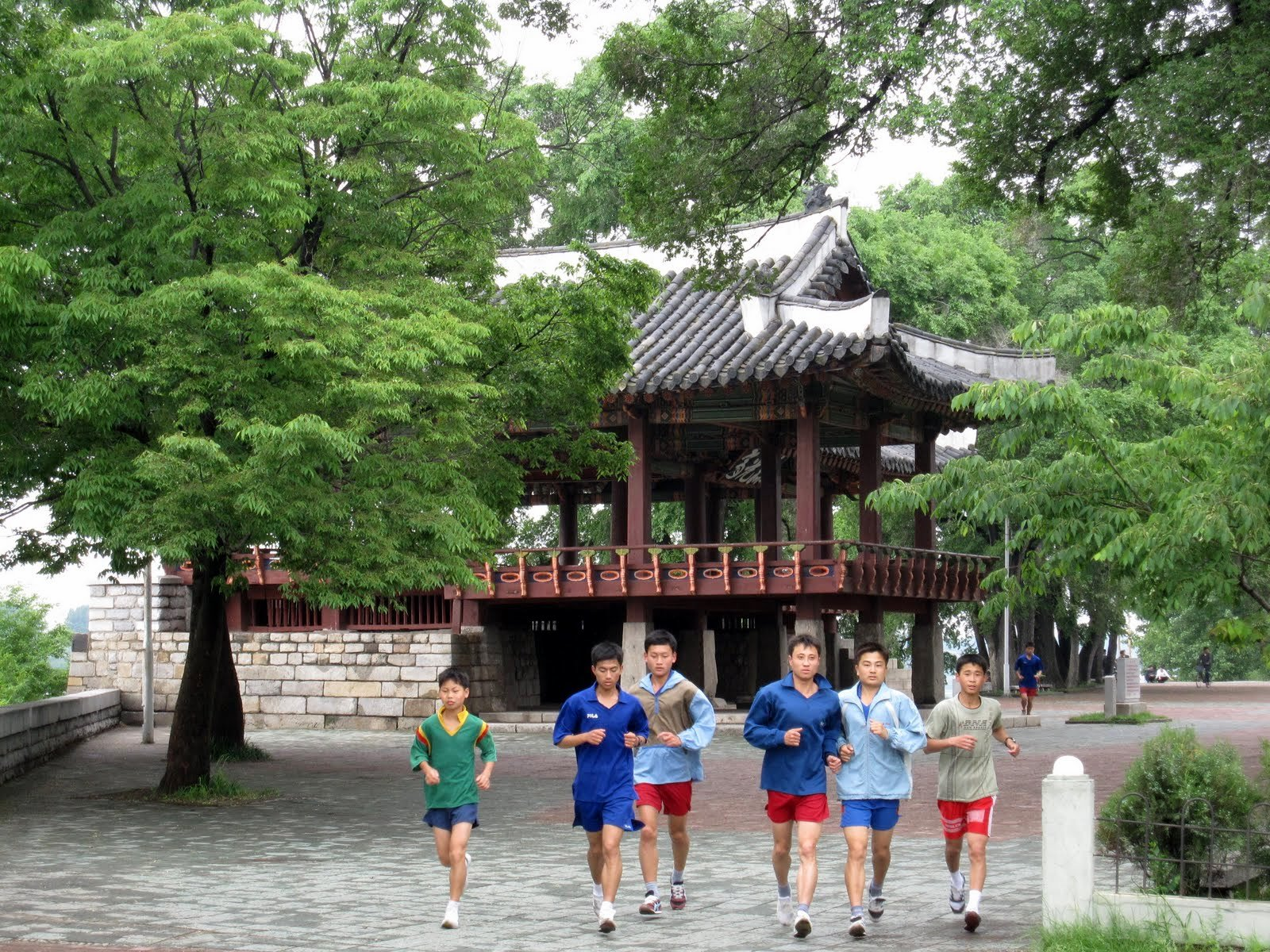

Korean name
- Hangul: 련광정
- Hanja: 練光亭
- RR: Ryeongwangjeong
- MR: Ryŏn'gwangjŏng

Ryongwang Pavilion is a scenic overlook located in the central district of Pyongyang, North Korea. Located on the bank of the Taedong River, the pavilion was first constructed during the Goguryeo dynasty as "Sansu Pavilion", and was part of the defenses of the walled city of Pyongyang (along with the nearby Taedong Gate and Pyongyang Bell). It is labeled as National Treasure #16 in North Korea.

== History ==
The pavilion first gained fame after Pyongyang was captured during Toyotomi Hideyoshi's invasions of Korea in the 16th century; under the orders of General Kim Eung-seo, a kisaeng named Gye Wolhyang seduced and drugged the Japanese commander of Pyongyang, Konishi Hidanokami, in the pavilion. She then led General Kim to the sleeping commander, where he beheaded him; though Kim escaped, Kye was later executed for her role in the plot. Kim Ung So later returned to liberate Pyongyang in 1593 with the help of the Ming Chinese Army, and built a shrine to Wolhyang next to the pavilion (the district in Moranbong-guyok where she lived was also named after her).

The pavilion was converted into a scenic overlook under the Koryo dynasty, and became a popular subject with poets and artists alike; A famous story relates how the Koryo-dynasty poet Kim Hwang Won broke his brush and wept after being unable find words to express the beauty of the view. The pavilion was later reconstructed under the Joseon dynasty and rechristened as "Ryongwang" pavilion because of its commanding views over the Taedong. In 1835, the small wooden shrine to Kye Wolhyang was replaced with a granite marker praising her patriotism.

Though severely damaged during the U.S. bombings of Pyongyang during the Korean War, the pavilion was restored shortly after. Restoration work carried out in the 2010s was done in cooperation with the Prince Claus Fund, Paektu Cultural Exchange operator Michael Spavor, and the North's National Administration for the Protection of Cultural Heritage.

== See also ==
- National Treasures of North Korea
- Pyongyang Castle
- Taedong Gate
