= Pubyok Pavilion =

Building in Pyongyang, North Korea

- Hangul: 부벽루
- Hanja: 浮碧樓
- RR: Bubyeongnu
- MR: Pubyŏngnu

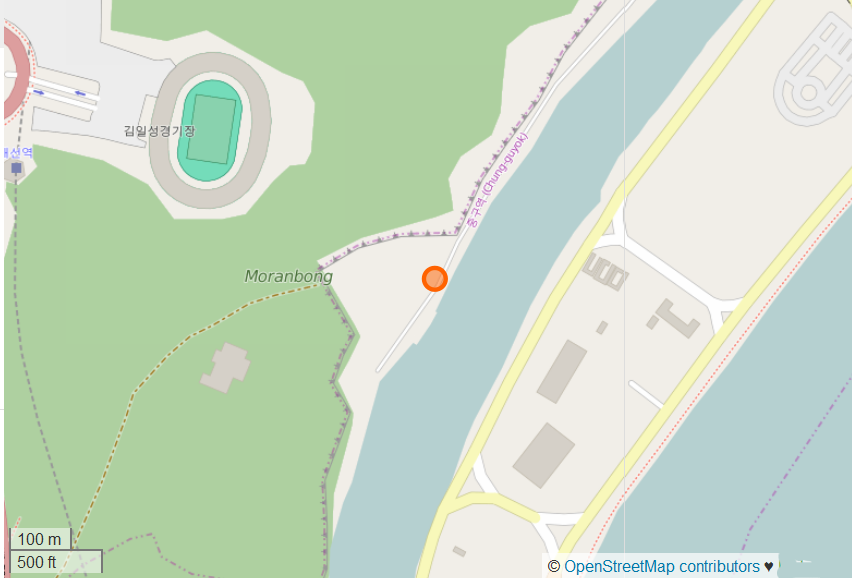
The Pavilion marked with an orange circle. Located near the Taedong River, in the Moranbong Park.

The Pubyok Pavilion (Korean: 부벽루) is located on Moran Hill, in Pyongyang, Democratic People’s Republic of Korea. The structure is one of the National Treasures of North Korea.

The pavilion is located on an embankment of the shoreline of the Taedong river. Photos of the area were taken by Shannon Boyd-Bailey McCune for research for his doctoral dissertation "Climatic Regions of Tyosen (Korea)" The site's name Pubyok means floating walls, as if the site floats on the river.

Originally known as the Yongmyong Pavilion, it was built as an annex of the Yongmyong Temple in 393. The site was renamed the Pubyok Pavilion in the early 12th century. According to Naenara: "The pavilion blends well with beautiful landscape around Moran Hill, and the moon viewed from Pubyok Pavilion is noted as one of the eight beautiful sights of Pyongyang”, particularly when the sun sets over the hills and the moon rises high in the sky. The beauty of the area inspired Kim Hwang-won a famous poet of the Goryeo period, to partially compose a poem about the scenery: "The foot of the moss-grown old rampart/Is washed by blue streams./Dawn is breaking over the vast fields/And the rows of mountains." Legend says he was unable to find the words to properly describe the beauty of the view, and threw away his writing brush in disgust.

== Description ==
The pavilion measures 14.58 m by 7.68 m. The creeper-patterned board on top of the first cornice on a pillar supporting a beam looks similar to a wood carving. The structure “preserves the features unique to Korean wooden structures. Its pillars, roof and all other architectural elements are well-balanced and looking solemn and spacious”.
