= Uiju Castle =

16th century castle in North Korea

Uiju Castle is a historic structure located on the Chinese border, along the Yalu River in Uiju County, in North Pyongan Province, North Korea. A structure first built during the Ri Dynasty was designed to serve as the main border town (Uiju) in the area and was one of the most important northern defense posts during this time (the area had been fortified since the time of the Koryo dynasty). The present castle was built in 1520, it probably included parts of the old fortress. It is listed as one of the National Treasures of North Korea.

== Description ==
As built, the castle surrounding the town was approximately 8.3 km (5.2 mi) in circumference. The castle walls were built using rough, square stones with a height of up to five meters. It had gates at each of the four cardinal points and contained 43 wells. Much of the castle was destroyed during the Japanese colonial period, but the remains of the south gate are well-preserved; it is a majestic dragon gate in the style of Confucian Chinese architecture. Notably, the Tonggun Pavilion was the northern terrace of the Castle. It is cited as one of the Eight Scenic Spots in the Kwanso Area of the country.

== History ==
During the Japanese invasions of Korea in 1592, King Seonjo of Joseon took refuge at Uiju, taking the ancestral tablets from Jongmyo and the shrines with him; the tablets were returned to Seoul in October of 1593.

Im Gyeong-eop was in charge of the castle in the early 17th century.

During the Manchu invasion of Korea in 1636, Qing soldiers were able to sneak into the fortress through a drainage hole and opened the gate of the fortress.

In June 2015, a painting dated from 1723 depicting the castle, was found in the collections of the Yamaguchi Prefectural University, having never before seen by the public. It was probably brought to Japan by Terauchi Masatake, among other items smuggled into Japan by Masatake.
