= Choesung Pavilion =

Historic building in Pyongyang, North Korea

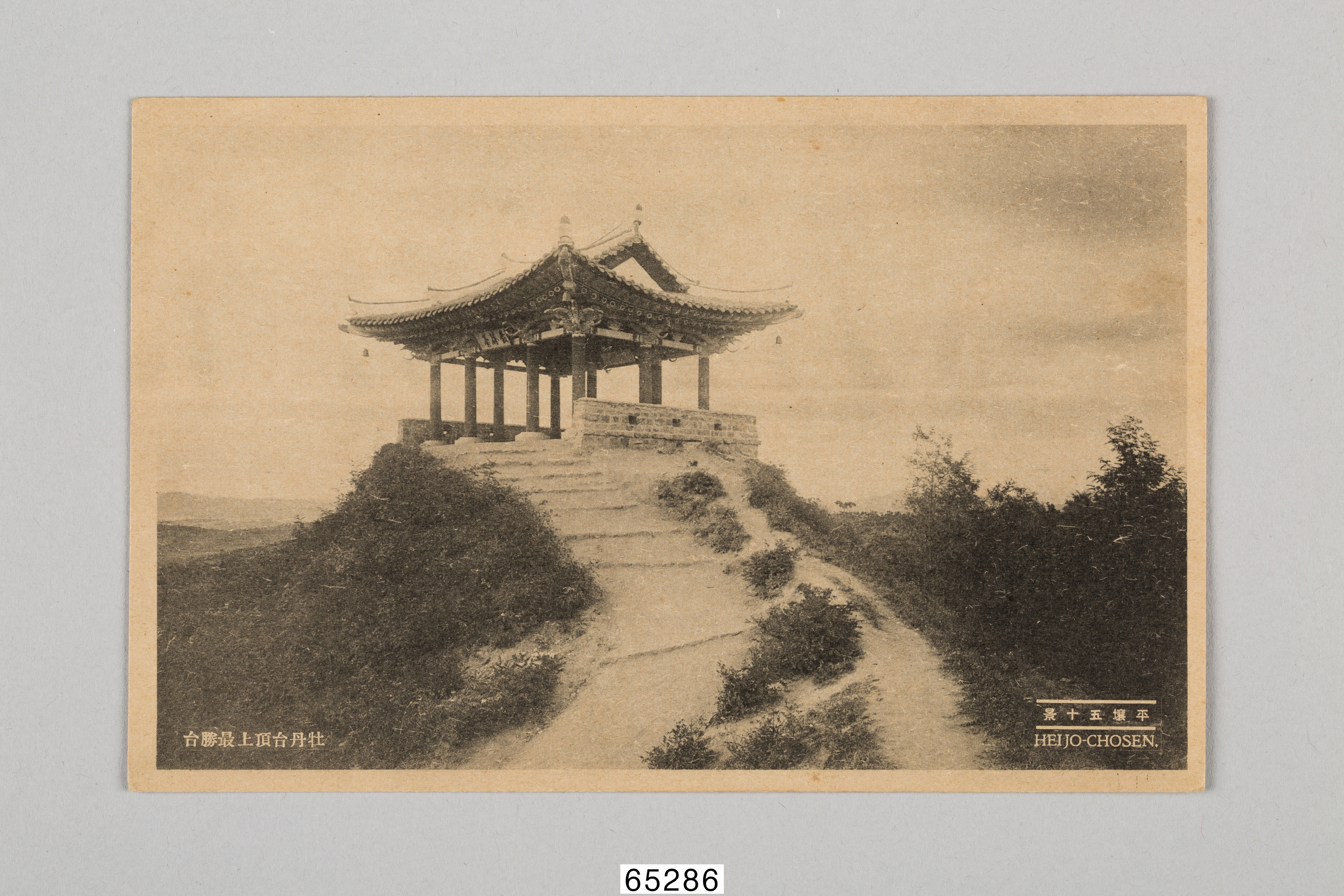
Old postcard view of the Pavilion

The Choesung Pavilion (Korean: 최승대) is an historic structure located on Moran Hill in Kyongsang-dong, Chung-guyok, Pyongyang, North Korea. First built in the 6th century, it was rebuilt in 1716. One of the National Treasures of North Korea, it is located at the highest point of the hill, 95 meters above ground. The pavilion is bounded on the south and west by rounded, low summits separated by three valleys. It offers views of the many species of trees growing on the hill, including pine, fir, Korean pine, trifoliate pine, linden and poplar. One can seasonally also observe over 70 species of birds from the location.

The Pavilion was originally called “Osung”, but was renamed “Choesung” for the excellent views it commands; these views make the pavilion a popular local tourist attraction.

== Description ==
Per the KCNA: “The single-storied building with a hip-saddle roof and double eaves has battlements and a whole ceiling.” The Pavilion has a facade 7.36 metres long and a flank of 4.67 metres. It is one of many historic structures on the hill, including the Ulmil, Chongnyu and Pubyok pavilions and the Chilsong, Jongum, Hyonmu and Tongam gates.

Local legend tells that a group of fairies came down from the heavens to enjoy themselves around the pavilion amongst the many beautiful flowers and trees.

=== Military History ===
The structure (along with the Ulmil Pavilion, which both served as command posts) was used by local troops to keep watch on potential foreign aggressors, given its high location on the hill. It also served as a command post for Konishi Yukinaga and 2,000 bodyguard troops during the Samurai Invasion of Korea in the 1590s and would see fierce fighting in the battles in the area, between the Japanese that had taken over the area and the Chinese troops that came to liberate Pyongyang in the aftermath.
