= Chonjusa =

Buddhist temple at Yaksan, North Korea

Coordinates: 39°48′27″N 125°46′53″E

- Hangul: 천주사
- Hanja: 天柱寺
- RR: Cheonjusa
- MR: Ch'ŏnjusa

Ch'ŏnjusa (Korean: 천주사) is a Korean Buddhist temple located on the southern slope of Yaksan mountain, in Yongbyon, North Pyongan province, North Korea. It is listed as National Treasure #46 in that country. Founded in 1684 during the mid-Joseon dynasty, the temple today retains its main prayer hall, known as Pogwang Hall (普光殿); the Chonju Pavilion (天柱樓), once known as one of the six most scenic spots in Yongbyon; and several lesser outbuildings, including storage rooms, and dormitories. Many buildings still feature delicate original paintings in a well-preserved state.

== See also ==
- National Treasures of North Korea
- Korean Buddhism
- Korean architecture
