= Sogwangsa =

Buddhist temple in North Korea

Coordinates: 38°59′27″N 127°23′41″E

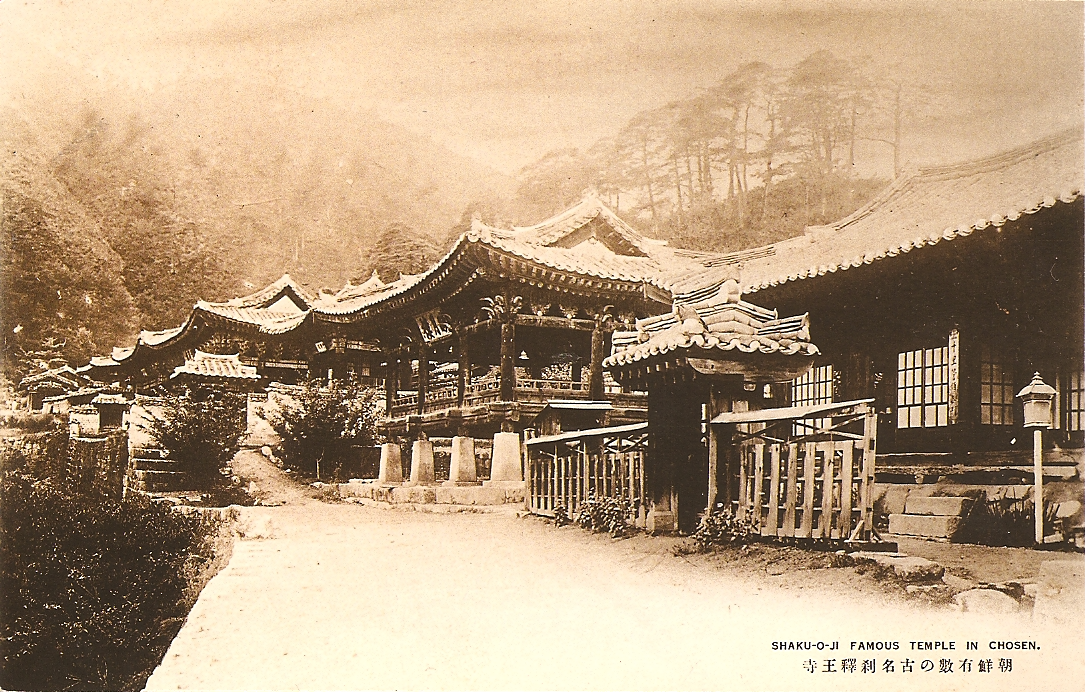
- Sogwang Temple in the 1930s

Korean name
- Hangul: 석왕사
- Hanja: 釋王寺
- RR: Seogwangsa
- MR: Sŏgwangsa

Sŏgwangsa (Korean: 석왕사) is a Korean Buddhist temple located in Sŏlbong-ri in Kosan County, Kangwon Province, North Korea. Once one of Korea's largest Buddhist temples, the complex was mostly destroyed by US bombing in 1951 and is in ruins. It is listed as National Treasure #94

== See also ==
- National Treasures of North Korea
- Korean Buddhism
- Korean architecture
