= Lion Pagoda of Kumjang Hermitage =

- Chosŏn'gŭl: 금장암 사자탑
- Hancha: 金藏庵獅子塔
- Revised Romanization: Geumjangam Sajatap
- McCune–Reischauer: Kŭmjangam Sajat'ap

The Lion Pagoda of Kumjang Hermitage is an historic structure located in Naegang-ri, Kumgang-gun, North Korea. It is near the Saja Pagoda and Pidan Falls.

Built during the Koryo Dynasty period, the pagoda is a three-storeyed granite tower standing 3.87m high, supported by four squatting lion-shaped sculptures located at each of the four corners of the podium slab. The ground floor is an undecorated stone slab, 49 cm thick and approximately 2m long on each side. The four lion statues support the upper level; they are 1.1m high. In the center of the podium is a statue of the Buddha, 88 cm high. Under each story are footstones, three on the first level and two on the second and third levels. The top part of the pagoda is missing. "The roof surface is comparatively steep and slightly curved. Each of the four corners of the roof stone has a metal ring which used to hold wind-bells. (…)The tower is an excellent monument—it is well balanced with the lion sculptures on the base for its pillar. Though the lion sculptures and the Buddhist statue look unfinished for its clumsy trimming, the lion sculptures appear strong and stable in supporting the tower body."
