= Chongam-ri Earthen Castle =

Gojoseon-era fortification in Pyongyang, North Korea

Coordinates: 39°2′21.19″N 125°45′45.09″E

- Chosŏn'gŭl: 청암리토성
- Hancha: 淸岩里土城
- Revised Romanization: Cheongamni toseong
- McCune–Reischauer: Ch'ŏngamni t'osŏng

The Chongam-ri Earthen Castle is a fortification thought to date to the Gojoseon period. Located near Pyongyang, North Korea, it is similar to other earthen fortifications of the period. It was made of alternating layers of soil, rock and sand. It is one of the National Treasures of North Korea. The wall is crescent-shaped and about 3450 metres long.

A jeweled, gilded crown dissolved in mercury, dating from the Three Kingdoms period, was found at the site.
