= Hyangsan County =

Hyangsan County 향산군
- County

Korean transcription(s)
  - Chosŏn'gŭl: 향산군
  - Hancha: 香山郡
  - McCune-Reischauer: Hyangsan-gun
  - Revised Romanization: Hyangsan-gun
- Coordinates: 40.0104°N 126.1837°E
- Country: North Korea
- Province: Chagang
- Administrative divisions: 1 ŭp, 20 ri

Area
  - Total: 481 km^{2} (186 sq mi)

Population (2008)
  - Total: 52,350
  - Density: 109/km^{2} (282/sq mi)

Hyangsan County is a kun, or county, in Chagang province, North Korea. It was established, following the division of Korea, from portions of Nyŏngbyŏn county. The area of Myohyangsan mountain, which stands on the county's border, has been developed as a tourist destination. Accordingly, there are numerous tourism-related institutions in the Myohangsan area.

== History ==
In July 2023, Hyangsan County was transferred from North Pyongan Province to Chagang Province.

== Geography ==
The Myohyangsan and Pinandŏk ranges pass through Hyangsan. The terrain is primarily mountainous, with numerous peaks. The highest of these is Pirobong. There are also many streams, of which the chief are the Ch'ŏngch'ŏn and Kuryong Rivers. Some 77% of the county's area is occupied by forestland. The eastern side of Hyangsan is generally high, while the western side is lower; as one goes from east to west, the elevation of the peaks drops from above 1000 m to less than 300 m.

== Administrative divisions ==
Hyangsan county is divided into 1 ŭp (town) and 20 ri (villages):

- Hyangsan-ŭp (향산읍)
- Chosal-li (조산리)
- Ch'ŏnsong-ri (청송리)
- Ch'ŏnsu-ri (천수리)
- Hasŏ-ri (하서리)
- Hamyang-ri (함양리)
- Kajwa-ri (가좌리)
- Kudu-ri (구두리)
- Kwanha-ri (관하리)
- Puksinhyŏl-li (북신현리)
- Rimhŭng-ri (림흥리)
- Ripsŏng-ri (립석리)
- Rohyŏl-li (로현리)
- Ryongsŏng-ri (룡성리)
- Sangro-ri (상로리)
- Sangsŏ-ri (상서리)
- Sinhwa-ri (신화리)
- Sŏkch'ang-ri (석창리)
- Suyang-ri (수양리)
- T'aep'yŏng-ri (태평리)
- Unbong-ri (운봉리)

== Economy ==
The chief local industry is agriculture, dominated by dry-field farming. The principal crops include maize, rice, and soybeans. In addition, there are also orchards and livestock farms; the chief fruit products are apples and pears. Sericulture is also practised, and there is some manufacturing.

== Transportation ==
The Manp'o Line of the Korean State Railway passes through the county. In addition, there are various roads.

== See also ==
- Geography of North Korea
- Administrative divisions of North Korea
- North Pyongan
