= Jongum Gate =

Historic building in Pyongyang, North Korea

- Hangul: 전금문
- Hanja: 轉錦門
- RR: Jeongeummun
- MR: Chŏn'gŭmmun

The Jongum Gate (Korean: 전금문; also known as the Chŏn'gŭm Gate) is one of the gates of the Pyongyang walls. It is located on Moran Hill in Pyongyang, North Korea.

== History ==
The gate served as a rally point from which soldiers and residents of Pyongyang fought the Japanese invaders during the Imjin Patriotic War (1592–1598). When the Pyongyang castle was rebuilt in 1714, the gate was renovated into an arch and the pavilion above the entrance was rebuilt. The gate was destroyed by US bombing during the Korean War; it was restored in 1959.

The structure used to be the southern gate of the Northern Fort in Pyongyang during the Koguryŏ period. It offers access to the ferry in the Taedong River.

== Description ==
The original gate had two wooden doors. The entrance to the doorway is built with well-trimmed granite stones, its walls are made of seven layers of big stones and the roof is made of fifteen fan-shaped stones. "The pavilion above the gate has four columns (7.36 meters) on the facade and three columns (4.35 meters) on the flank and (a) hip-saddled roof. It is painted red and blue, adding beauty to the gate".

It is listed as one of the National Treasures of North Korea.

== See also ==
- National Treasures of North Korea
