= Ryonggok Academy =

Historic building in Pyongyang, North Korea

- Hangul: 룡곡서원
- Hanja: 龍谷書院
- RR: Ryonggok seowon
- MR: Ryonggok sŏwŏn

The Ryonggok Confucian Shrine and Academy is located in Mangyongdae-guyok, Pyongyang, North Korea. It is listed as a National Treasure of North Korea.

== History ==
Built in 1656, the Shrine is located on the slopes of Mount Ryonggak, about ten kilometers from Pyongyang. The Academy was damaged by fire in the early 1710s, and was rebuilt in 1713.

The Academy served as a private educational institution during the Ri Dynasty. The complex includes two quarters - an auditorium and a shrine. The buildings were constructed in a row on sloping land. The auditorium quarter include an east classroom and a west classroom. Behind the shrine is a pavilion with a calligraphic board hung under the eaves of the roof.

The complex is also known as the Ryonggok Auditorium. The main building is known as the Taesong Hall; it is the largest building on the complex. The Taesong Hall's roof has a windbreak board on each side, “a unique form, rare to be seen in other old architectures”. The Auditorium includes an outer door, a dormitory and an inner door. The outer door has a two storied gable roof. The first floor of the complex was used as an auditorium and the second floor was used as a lecture room. There are the eastern and western study rooms on the both sides of the inner court. A sign board bearing the school’s name hangs from the eaves of the shrine and a monument in the north western house explains that the school was built in 1713.

== Media Portrayal ==
The Shrine is featured in film Ten Zan: The Ultimate Mission.
