= Inpung Pavilion =

Coordinates: 40°58′17″N 126°35′16″E

The Inpung Pavilion (Korean: 인풍루; Hanja: 仁風樓) is a historic structure located in Kanggye, North Korea. It is listed as #64 on the list of National Treasures of North Korea.

The pavilion is located on the rocky cliffs banks of Jangja River, forming part of the town walls in Kanggye; the walls protected the city from invaders. Military training drills were held in the front courtyard of the Pavilion. Local lore holds that feudal rulers held bouts there, where there was drinking and reciting poems.

The pavilion was first built in 1472 and rebuilt in 1680. It has five bays on the front and three bays on the side. "By making use of natural slope, the pavilion has two storeys at the front and one storey at the back, and its floors are supported by 24 pillars which are about 1.18m long. The height of the ridge of its hip-saddled roofs is in conformity with the length and width of the building and the curved lines of its eaves and roofs look elegant."
