= Ryonghungsa =

- Hangul: 룡흥사
- Hanja: 龍興寺
- RR: Ryongheungsa
- MR: Ryonghŭngsa

Ryonghŭng-sa is a Korean Buddhist temple in Ponghung-ri, Yŏnggwang-gun, South Hamgyŏng Province, North Korea. Located on the slopes of Mt. Paegun, the temple was founded in 1048 under the Koryo dynasty and later renovated in 1794 under Joseon. The complex includes the following halls:

- Taeung Hall (대웅전/大雄殿)
- Hyangno Hall (향노전/香爐殿)
- Muryangsu Shrine (무량수각/無量壽閣)
- Sansin Shrine (산신각/山神閣)
- Unha Pavilion (운하당/雲霞樓)

== See also ==
- National Treasures of North Korea
- Korean Buddhism
- Korean architecture
