= Jamo Fortress =

Stone fortress in Pyongsong, North Korea

- Hangul: 자모산성
- Hanja: 慈母山城
- RR: Jamosanseong
- MR: Chamosansŏng

Jamo Fortress (Korean: 자모산성) is a stone fortress dating from the Goryeo period. One of the National Treasures of North Korea, it is located in Ojung-ni, Pyongsong, South Pyongan Province.

The fortress has a circumference of 451 m (1,480 ft) and a height of 2.7 m (8 ft 10 in). It suffered damage during the Second Manchu invasion of Korea. Most of the fortress has been ruined due to wind and frost in the area. It has come to be known by various names over time, including Seongsanseong, Seongjaesanseong, Jamosanseong and Gadeungsanseong.
