= Chongnyu Pavilion =

Historic building in Pyongyang, North Korea

- Hangul: 청류정
- Hanja: 淸流亭
- RR: Cheongnyujeong
- MR: Ch'ŏngnyujŏng

The Chongnyu Pavilion (Korean: 청류정) or Chongryu Pavilion is an historic structure located on Moran Hill in Kyongsang-dong, Chung-guyok, Pyongyang, North Korea. It is another gate to the walled city of Pyongyang.

The colorfully painted pavilion has a crane-shaped roof propped up by ten pillars. It was built during the period of the Koguryo kingdom, and rebuilt in 1716. The structure was damaged during the Korean War, but has since been rebuilt by the government in 1959.
