= Five-storied pagoda of Ryongtongsa Buddhist temple =

Pagoda in North Korea

- Chosŏn'gŭl: 령통사오층탑
- Hancha: 靈通寺五層塔
- Revised Romanization: Yeongtongsa-ocheungtap
- McCune–Reischauer: Ryŏngt'ongsa-och'ŭngt'ap

The Five-storied pagoda of Ryongtongsa Buddhist temple is listed as a National Treasure of North Korea.

The pagoda is 6.48 m high, built with "well-trimmed granite stones" on a platform with a width of 3.23 m. Dating from the Koryo Dynasty, it is located 10 km north of Kaesong. The KCNA describes it as representative of "the high architecture in the early days of the Koryo Dynasty."
