= Honam-ri Four Spirits Tomb =

Koguryo-era tombs in North Korea

- Hangul: 호남리사신총
- Hanja: 湖南里四神塚
- RR: Honam-ri sasinchong
- MR: Honam-ri sasinch'ong

The Honam-ri Four Spirits Tomb (Korean: 호남리사신총) is a tomb located in Honam-ri, Samsŏk-guyŏk, Pyongyang, North Korea. Dating from the Goguryeo period, it is part of the Complex of Koguryo Tombs, a UNESCO World Heritage site, and a National Treasure of North Korea #26. The site was placed on the “UNESCO World Heritage List as a monument, in view of its outstanding artistic, historic, cultural and architectural value”

== Description ==
The Four Spirit tomb is one of about 30 individual graves, dating from the later period of the Koguryo Kingdom, consisting of an earthen mound with stone foundations. It has a rectangular, stone-piled basement along the edges of the mound. It is of a smaller site compared to others on site, with only 0.8 hectares listed as protected in the nomination documents. The site sits side-by-side (from west to east) with the Mausoleum Area of Tomb of King Tongmyong and Jinpha-ri group of tombs. It measures 3.6 by 3.1 meters, with a height of 3 meters. It was discovered during the Japanese occupation of Korea, in October 1916 by four Japanese archeologists, during the process of excavating other tombs around Mount Taesong. It was further excavated by the Japanese in 1930 and 1937; crown pendants and bone fragments were found. At the time of nomination for UNESCO status, the tomb was closed to the public.

The tomb features representations of the Four Guardians, the Azure Dragon, the Vermilion Bird, the White Tiger, and the Black Tortoise that were adapted from Chinese culture as it spread eastward, into Korea and later into Japan. The Honamri tomb is one of two current examples showing the use of the Four Guardians in sacred tombs in the area. The Four Spirit tomb dates from the late 5th to early 6th Century; it has no corridor or ceiling paintings, only the Four Guardian paintings in the back chamber.

The tombs in question are part of a collection of tombs located both in China and North Korea. Despite limited financial resources, North Korea sought to have the tombs located on their side of the border registered as a UNESCO World Heritage Site, earlier than China did for those in their territory. They were finally listed on the UNESCO World Heritage List in July 2004, during the 28th session of the World Heritage Committee in Suzhou, China. As both countries claim Goguryeo ruins as part of their heritage, the applications for UNESCO listings from both countries were published on the same day, to avoid any ideas of favouring one viewpoint over another.

As one of many tombs in the larger Complex of Koguryo Tombs, it can be thought of as a living quarters for the soul of the deceased, built as a house for the deceased to carry on his activities. Religious beliefs in Koguryo at the time thought that the soul was immortal and would continue living after the body died. The Four Guardian Deities are believed to represent the four cardinal points and also serve to ward off evil spirits.
