= Changsong Provincial School =

Confucian school in Changsong, North Korea

- Hangul: 창성향교
- Hanja: 昌城鄕校
- RR: Changseong hyanggyo
- MR: Ch'angsŏng hyanggyo

The Changsong Provincial School (Korean: 창성향교) is a historical Confucian school located in Changsong County, North Phyongan Province, North Korea. It is designated as one of the National Treasures of North Korea.

The school was established in the early days of the Joseon Dynasty. One ridgepole has an inscription saying it was rebuilt in 1765. The School served as the first institution to teach children of the local aristocratic class feudalistic Confucianism. In the front of the building is the Myongryun Hall which has no walls. It has a façade 15.4 meters wide and is 5.6 meters long. At the back of the hall are two gabled houses that face each other, known as Tong-mu and So-mu. These houses have double eaves built on a terraced base. The Taesong Hall which stands behind the two houses is also a gabled house with double eaves, measuring 11.15 meters wide by 7.1 meters long. It has “exquisitely dovetailed” pillars and roof brackets. The school complex "has unique features of composition and placement common to such buildings of those days, thus representing the contemporary architecture and management of Confucian schools".
