= Chongrungsa =

Buddhist temple in North Korea

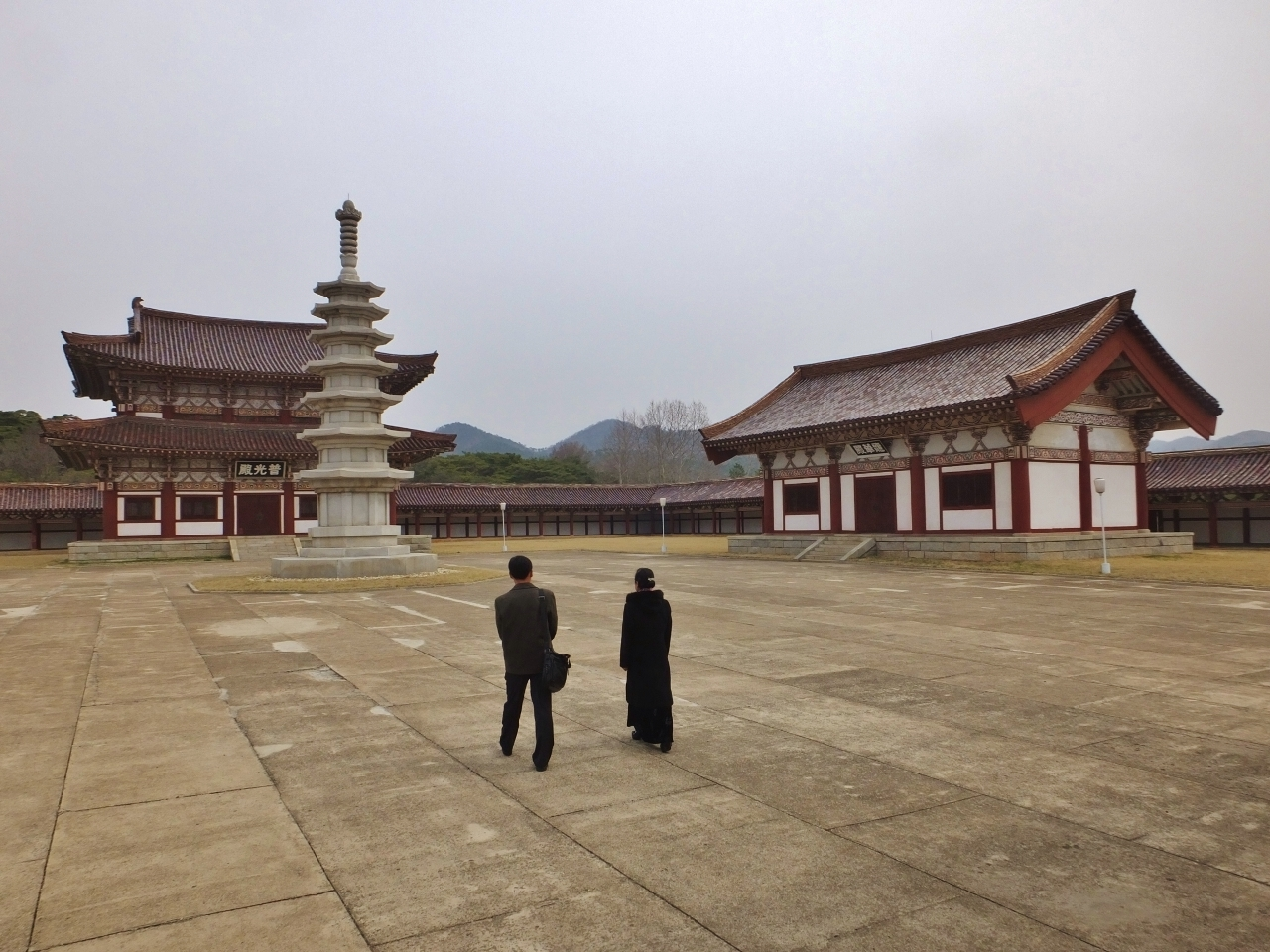

Korean name
- Hangul: 정릉사
- Hanja: 定陵寺
- RR: Jeongneungsa
- MR: Chŏngnŭngsa

The Chongrungsa Buddhist temple is an historic structure located in Ryongsan-ri, Ryokpo-guyok, Pyongyang, North Korea. It dates from the 5th Century and has been extensively excavated and surveyed. It serves as an important example in the study of temple construction in Goguryeo and is a National Treasure of North Korea . Both the pagoda (as described below) and the temple itself are listed as National Treasures.

== History ==
An octagonal seven-story pagoda is built in the central courtyard of the temple. Three golden halls are located around the pagoda; this arrangement with three halls around a pagoda would become a standard in Pyongyang as the capital of Goguryeo. An original wooden pagoda was on the grounds, later replaced by a stone pagoda made in the image of the wooden one. The site was excavated in 1974-1975 by the Kim Il-sung Comprehensive University.

The temple was rebuilt to mark the 2300th anniversary of King Tongmyong and is featured on a series of postage stamps issues by North Korea in January 1994.

== Description ==
The monastery is a large structure, measuring 223m east to west and 132.8m north to south. Based on excavations done circa 2002, the monastery consisted of several compounds separated by a portico. Approximately 20 buildings were found in the compounds, all serving different purposes and constructed at different times.

An octagonal stone foundation is located in the center of the complex with sides measuring 8.4m and is thought to be the foundation of the pagoda. It is surrounded by the three golden halls, each set on a foundation measuring 20m by 14m. A gate is located along the south portico, three-bay wide and two-bay deep, embedded in the structure. In the rear of the compound, the remains of a large rectangular structure, over 40m in length and embedded in the north portico is thought to be a lecture hall.

On both sides of the middle hall stood two square buildings, thought to be the Sutra hall and a bell tower. Neither structure is mentioned in documents from the period; both are thought to be a later addition to the complex.
