= Haeju Dharani Monument =

- Chosŏn'gŭl: 해주 다라니석당
- Hancha: 海州陀羅尼石幢
- Revised Romanization: Haeju Darani Seokdang
- McCune–Reischauer: Haeju Tarani Sŏktang

The Haeju Dharani Monument is one of the National Treasures of North Korea. It is located in Haechong-dong, Haeju, North Korea. Similar Dharani pillars are found in China.

The stone monument is over 5 meters in height. It has three sections; the lower two-tiered round plinth has two layers of carved floral leaves along the edges, the middle portion stands on the plinth and the upper portion is made of three-tiered hexagonal stones decreasing upwards in width and in height. The upper portion's eaves, ridges and top of the roofing stones are slightly bent. Stones in a hexagonal shape on the back side and in the shape of a drum on the front side are sandwiched between the roofing stones.
