= Chilsongmun =

Historic gate in Pyongyang, North Korea

Coordinates: 39°02′10″N 125°45′15″E

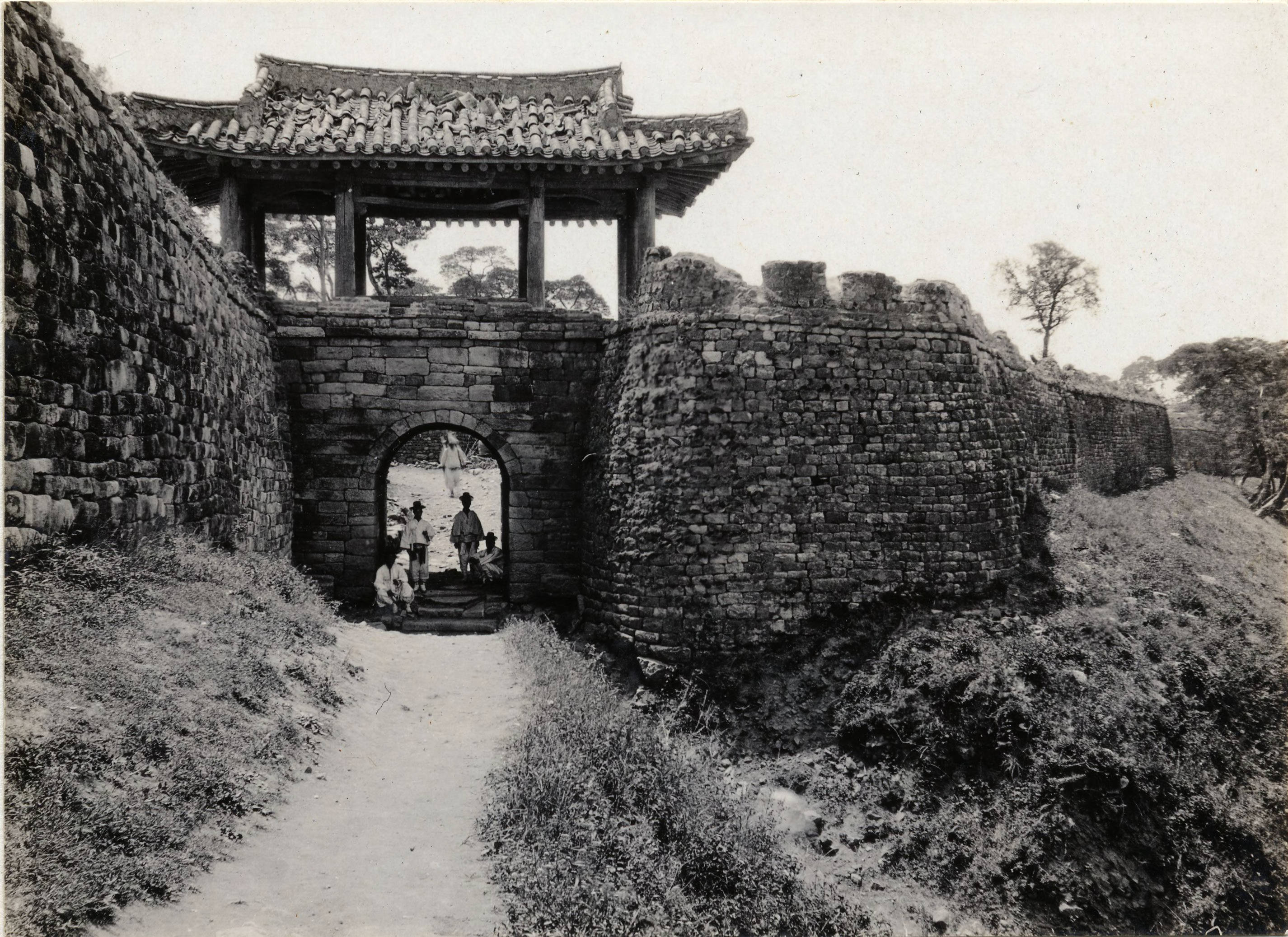
- The gate in 1908

Korean name
- Hangul: 칠성문
- Hanja: 七星門
- RR: Chilseongmun
- MR: Ch'ilsŏngmun

Ch'ilsŏng Gate (Korean: 칠성문) is the northern gate of the inner castle of the walled city of Pyongyang (Pyongyang Castle). Located in the scenic Moranbong Park, the gate was originally built in the sixth century as an official Koguryo construction, although present construction dates from 1712.

The gate takes its name (which literally means "seven stars") from the seven brightest stars in the Great Bear constellation (also known as the Big Dipper). This constellation was revered in traditional Korean religion - for example, many Buddhist temples in Korea contain a "Chilsong shrine" or other similar structure.

Ch'ilsŏng Gate is National Treasure #18 in North Korea.

== Physical description ==
The gate's walls are built into the Hill's embankment, piled with trimmed stones built into an arch gate. The walls are about 10 metres apart, with the gatehouse placed on top of them. There is a battlement and a gatehouse on the embankment. The gatehouse has three bays with single gable eaves, measuring 7.38 metres in front and two bays in the rear, measuring 4.36 metres. There are pillars around the gatehouse, highlighting the middle bay; it has wooden floor. The gatehouse contains a spacious room whose ceiling is supported without any beams.

== See also ==
- National Treasures of North Korea
