= Twin Column Tomb =

Koguryo-era tomb in Nampo, North Korea

UNESCO World Heritage Site
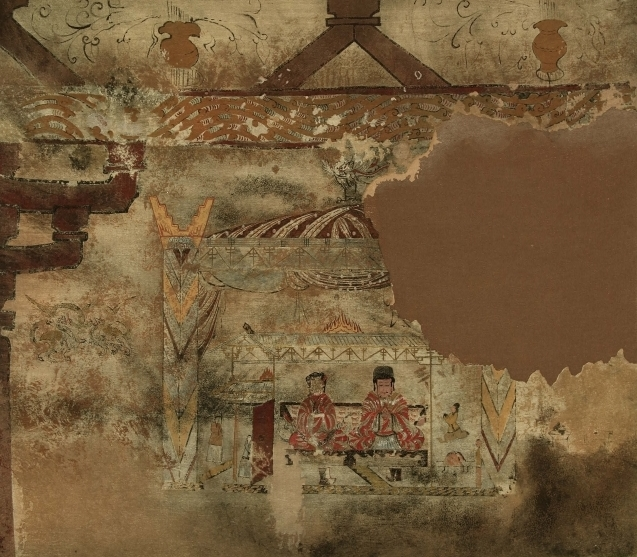
- Twin-Column Tomb

- Location within North Korea
- Location: Ryonggang in North Korea
- Part of: Complex of Koguryo Tombs
- Criteria: (i), (ii), (iii), (iv)
- Reference: 1091
- Inscription: 2004 (28th Session)
- Area: 234.73 ha (580.0 acres)
- Buffer zone: 1,701.2 ha (4,204 acres)
- Coordinates: 38°51′49″N 125°25′07″E

- Twin Column Tomb
- Chosŏn'gŭl: 쌍기둥무덤
- Revised Romanization: Ssanggidungmudeom
- McCune–Reischauer: Ssanggidungmudŏm

Alternative name
- Chosŏn'gŭl: 쌍영총
- Hancha: 雙楹塚
- Revised Romanization: Ssangyeongchong
- McCune–Reischauer: Ssangyŏngch'ong

The Twin Column Tomb (Korean: 쌍기둥무덤) is a two-chambered burial tomb dating from Koguryo period. It is located in Nampo, North Korea. It is listed as a National Treasure of North Korea for the painting on the north wall of the back chamber. The tomb was discovered by the Japanese during their occupation of the Korean Peninsula.

At the Korea International War Crimes Tribunal in June 2001, the DPRK alleged that US Forces used the tomb "to lock up and torture our innocent civilians, during which the frescos were ruthlessly destroyed".

== The paintings ==
The plaster walls of the tomb were richly decorated with people riding chariots and horses, as well as a musical band. They have all now but disappeared. A portion of the wall painting showing a horse rider was affixed to the wall in 1913, when the tomb was investigated by the Japanese; it later came to Joseon Government-General Museum and is now in the collection of the National Museum of Korea.
