= Kwansan-ri Dolmen =

One of the National Treasures of North Korea

- Chosŏn'gŭl: 관산리고인돌
- Hancha: 冠山里支石墓
- Revised Romanization: Gwansalli Goindol
- McCune–Reischauer: Kwansalli Koindol

The Kwansan-ri Dolmen is one of the National Treasures of North Korea. It is located in Kwansan-ri, Unnyul County, one of the many dolmen located in and around Pyongyang.

It is one of the largest dolmen in North Korea, thought to date from the early 10th century BC. The top stone weighs over 40 tons, with a length of 8.75m, a width of 4.5m and thickness that reaches 31cm.
