= Koguryo Wooden Bridge =

Ancient wooden bridge in North Korea

Listed as item #160 of the National Treasures of North Korea is a wooden bridge, dating from the Koguryo era(고구려나무다리).

The bridge was built in the early 5th Century in front of the Anhak Royal Palace. Only the foundations have survived to the present day. The structure is estimated to have been 375 metres long and 9 metres wide. The bridge crossed the Taedong River, linking Chongho-dong, in the Taesong District with Hyuam-dong, in the Sadong District of Pyongyang.

According to a reconstruction, both ends of the bridge were fan-shaped, covered with boards."Beams were laid lengthways and breadthways on the framework of the bridge and paved with trim planks upon which parapets were fixed for safety." The joints of the framework were rebated without using any form of hardware, such as clamps. A fire pit at the entrance of the bridge provided light during the night.
