= Paekmasan Fortress =

- Hangul: 백마산성
- Hanja: 白馬山城
- RR: Baengmasanseong
- MR: Paengmasansŏng

The Paekmasan Fortress is a walled fortress in Phihyon County, North Korea. It is listed as a National Treasure of North Korea (#58).

The fortress dates from the era of the Koguryo Kingdom; the outer walls were reinforced during the Koryo Dynasty and the Joseon Dynasty. The complex is built around the area of Mt. Paekma.

The walls of the fortress feature both inner and outer walls; the inner walls are 2590 meters long were reinforced in 1014–1017 with Uma Walls built during the Koguryo Kingdom as bedding. The outer walls are 2430 meters long and were built in 1753; they are five to seven meters high. The outer walls feature several arch-shaped gates in the east, west, south and north; a two-storied building located at the south gate was destroyed during the Japanese occupation of the area.

The enclosed area inside the fortress has 13 ponds, 32 wells, as well as an armory, a food storehouse and barracks.
