= Paeksang Pavilion =

Historic building in Anju, North Korea

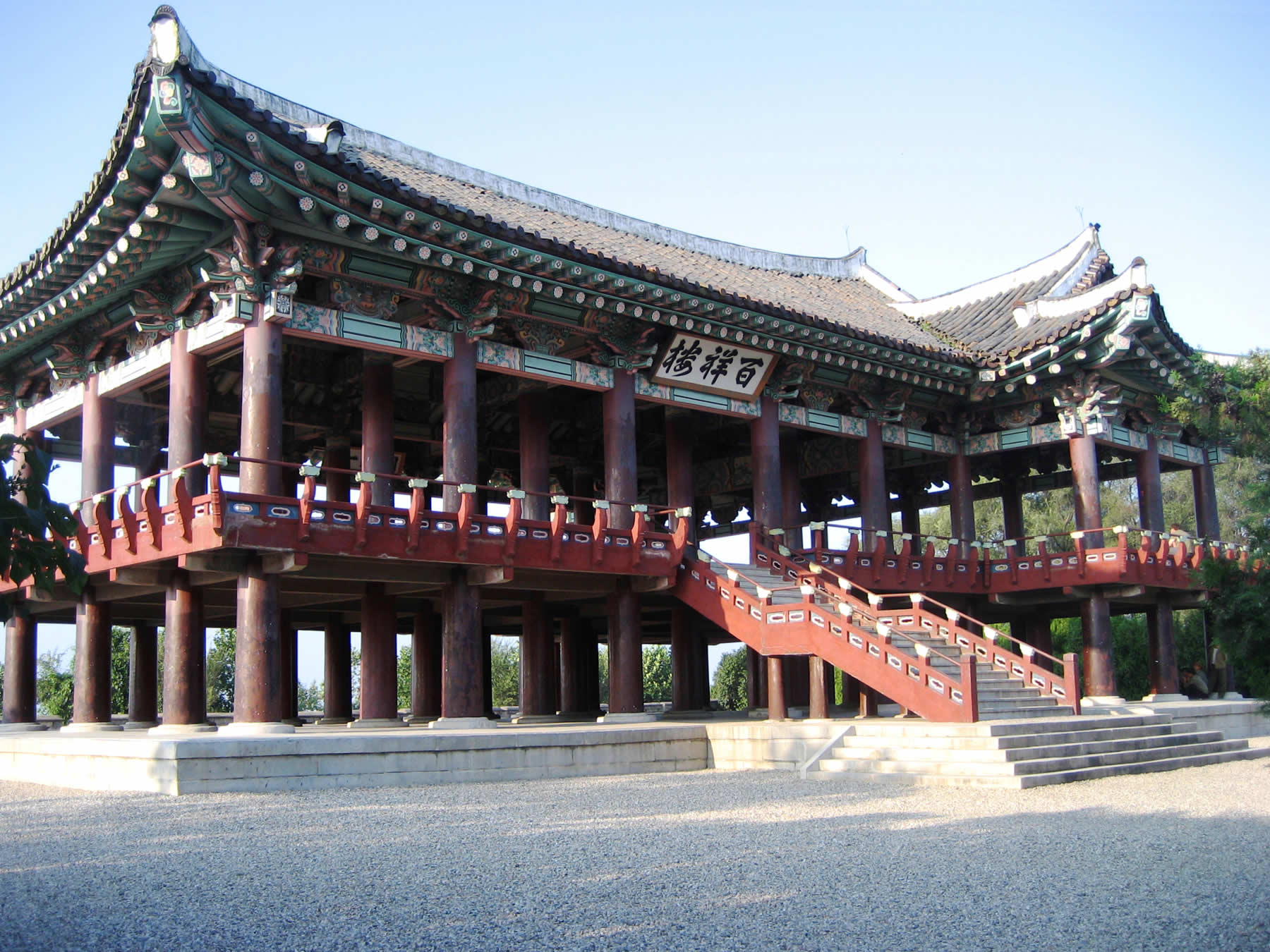
Paeksang Pavilion

The Paeksang Pavilion (Korean: 백상루) is an historic structure located at the site of the Anju Fortress in Anju City, South Phyongan Province, North Korea. It is a National Treasure of North Korea (#31). The name Paeksang means one hundred scenes, as it "commands a hundred beautiful scenes".

== History ==
The Pavilion was used as the command post of the Anju Fortress. First records of the Pavilion are found in the early part of the 14th Century. Koryo Dynasty ceramic items have been unearthed at the site. It was rebuilt in 1753 and once again after being destroyed during bombings in the Korean War.

== Description ==
The floor is laid at a height of 2.23m. Round pillars stand on the foundation stones of the temple, standing straight on the pillars under the floor. Stairs in the middle of the floor lead to the second story. The structure has a "well-designed" stylobate with middle sections wider than the other sections between pillars on the four sides, stressing the centre. The pavilion has a hip-saddle roof and its ceiling was designed to give offer a wide view of the surrounding area.
