= Kuchon Pavilion =

Historic structure in Hamhung, North Korea

- Hangul: 함흥성구천각
- Hanja: 咸興城九天閣
- Revised Romanization: Hamheungseong Gucheongak
- McCune–Reischauer: Hamhŭngsŏng Kuch'ŏn'gak

The Kuchon Pavilion is an historic structure, part of the Hamhung Fort. Located along the ridge of Mount Tonghung, in Hamhung, North Korea, it was built in 1108 and reconstructed in 1613. The Pavilion was built on a high foundation laid with granite pieces, serving as the northern command post of the Fort.

A granite sign in front of the Pavilion reads as follows: "The Great Leader Comrade Kim Il Sung and the Great Guide Comrade Kim Jong Il came to this place, pointed out that this is a very precious relic, and instructed for utmost preservation. "Kuchon Pavilion was built in 1108 AD under the Koryo dynasty as a watch point at the north end of Hamhung Fortress, and sitting on top of a hill, has a unique shape to it. "Kuchon Pavilion is a precious cultural relic that shows our forebears' patriotic spirit in repelling foreign invaders as well as their architectural skills. "People's Committee of South Hamgyong Province".
