= Kanggye Magistrate's Office =

Ri Dynasty government office, Kanggye, North Korea

- Chosŏn'gŭl: 강계아사
- Hancha: 江界衙舍
- Revised Romanization: Ganggye-asa
- McCune–Reischauer: Kanggye-asa

The Kanggye Magistrate's Office is an historical government office from the Ri Dynasty, located in Kanggye, North Korea.

The building was the office and residence of the Kanggye deputy magistrate, who also doubled as the local garrison commander. The building complex originally featured a courtyard with many buildings, but now only three remain—the east house, the inner house and a hexagonal arbor. The units were severely damaged during the Korean War but have since been restored to their former glory.

== Description of the buildings ==
The east house was built in 1663 but later burnt down, and was rebuilt in 1888. The building served as the office of the deputy magistrate, where he carried out his official duties in the house. The east house is 21.8 metres long and 9.8 m wide and has a floor area of 213 square metres. The structure is supported around its perimeter by two rows of 40 thick columns with a corridor in between them. The inner-row columns are linked by screens, forming partitions that could be moved up to a height for the creation of a larger space. The inner corridor is flanked by a backed railing. The columns feature carved lotus patterns, and those at the four corners have tops shaped like a dragon's head.

The inner house was the residence of the deputy magistrate. It is 20.05 metres long and 4.6 wide. This building has columns with a double bracketing system.

The hexagonal arbor was used as an archery ground for soldiers defending the northwestern areas of the complex.
