= Taedongmun =

East gate of Pyongyang, North Korea

Coordinates: 39°01′21″N 125°45′24″E

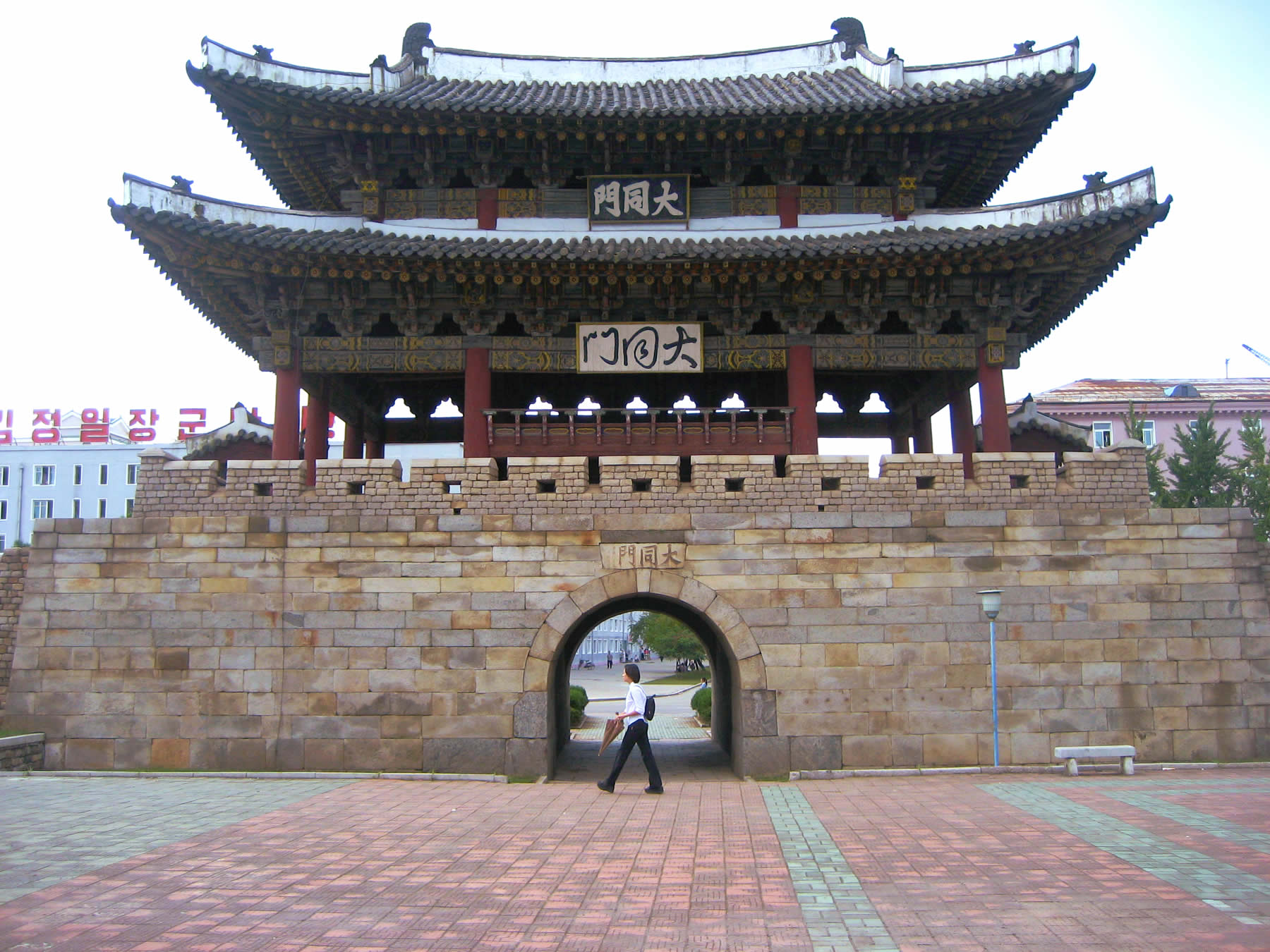
- Taedongmun on the Taedong River in Pyongyang

Korean name
- Hangul: 대동문
- Hanja: 大同門
- RR: Daedongmun
- MR: Taedongmun

Taedongmun (Korean: 대동문; lit. 'Taedong Gate') is the eastern gate of the inner castle of the walled city of Pyongyang (Pyongyang Castle), and one of the National Treasures of North Korea. Located on the banks of the Taedong River, from which it gets its name, the gate was originally built in the sixth century as an official Koguryo construction, and, along with the Ryongwang Pavilion and Pyongyang Bell, served as the center of the inner castle's eastern defenses. The present construction dates from 1635, however, as the original was burnt to the ground during the Imjin wars of the late 16th century. It is National Treasure #4 in North Korea and was designated it in 1960.

The current gate features a granite base topped by a two-story pavilion, called the Euphoru Pavilion (읍호루, 挹灝樓), because of its grand views of the Taedong River. This pavilion houses two hanging name plaques, one, on the first storey, reading "Taedong Gate" and calligraphed Yang Sa-on, and the other, reading "Upho Pavilion", on the second storey and written by Pak Wi (박위).

== History ==
The Taedongmun was constructed in the 6th century when Pyongyang was under the control of Goguryeo. It functioned as the eastern gate of the city's inner castle and was built on the banks of the Taedong River. From the Goguryeo to the Joseon, a ferry service operated outside of the gate to ferry people across the river. Throughout its history, the Taedongmun has been repeatedly damaged, rebuilt and renovated. In the Goguryeo-Tang War, it was destroyed by attacks from Tang soldiers and rebuilt in 947. In the Goryeo-Khitan Wars of the 10th and 11th centuries, it was destroyed by a fire and rebuilt again. It was again renovated or repaired in 1392, with some of the present stone pillars dating back to 1392. It was then burnt down in the Qing invasion of Joseon (Byeongja Horan). The current version of the gate was built in 1635, with renovations occurring in 1850. It was also damaged during the Japanese occupation of Korea and from the U.S. bombing of Pyongyang in the Korean War.

Prior to Japanese rule, the Taedongmun served as the main entrance to Pyongyang, with the main route of access to Pyongyang castle being via water transport on the Taedong River. As such, it became an important point for people and goods moving in and out of the city. The Taedongmun Road, which connected the gate to the urban areas of Pyongyang, formed the city's main thoroughfare. The construction of bridges across the Taedong reduced the gate's importance.

=== Taedongmun under the Japanese ===
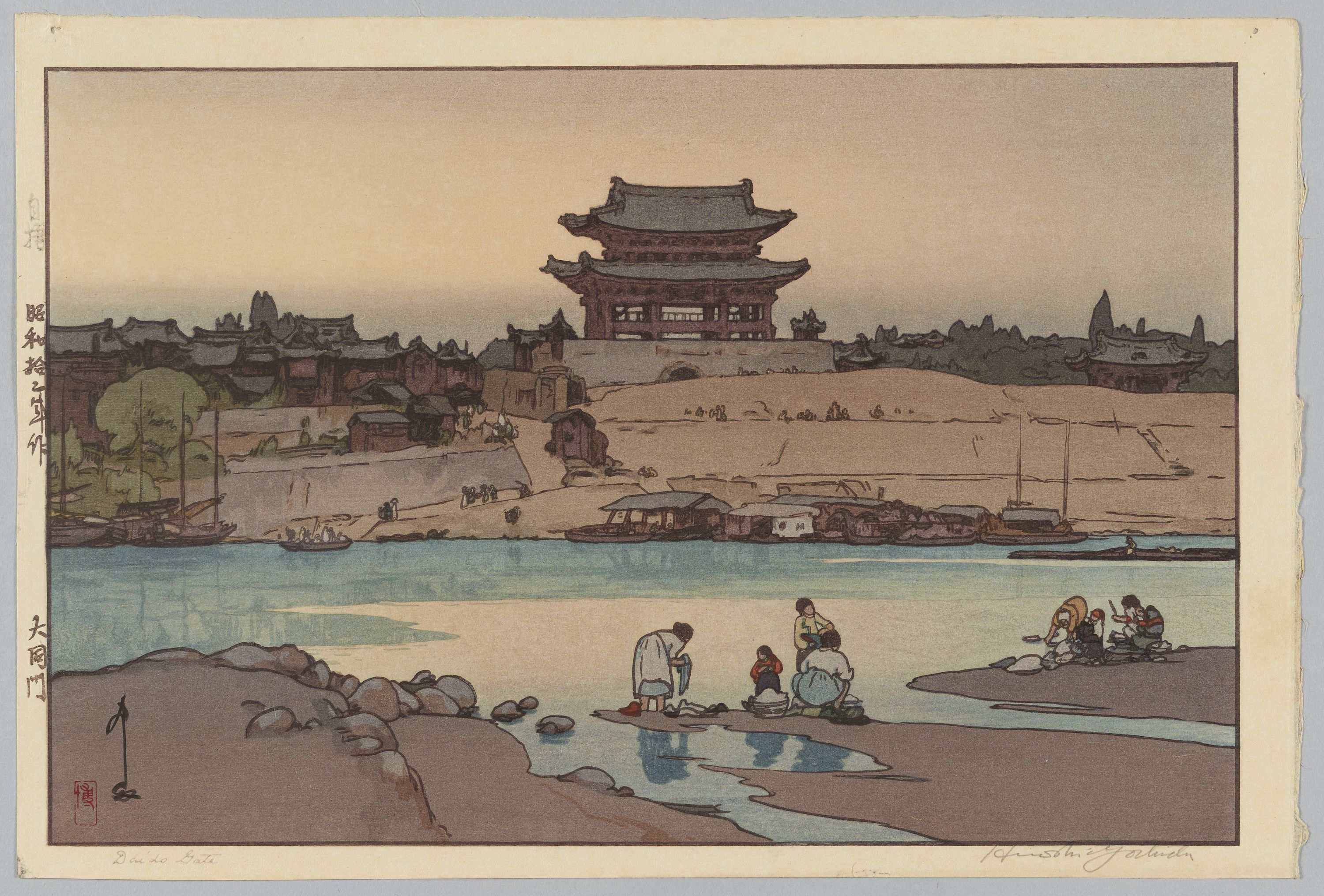
Painting of the Taedongmun and surrounding area completed by artist Hiroshi Yoshida in 1937.

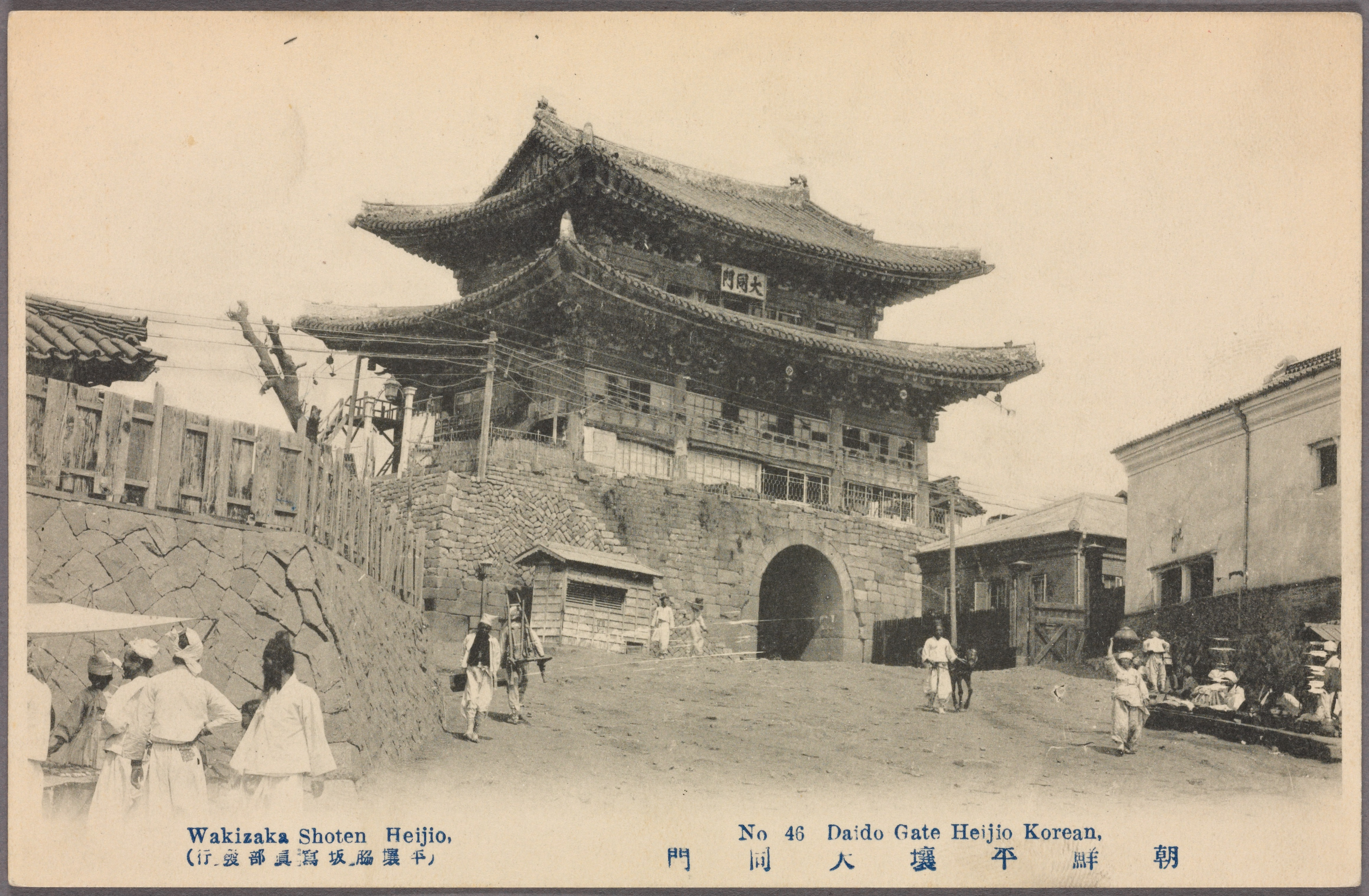
1907 photograph of the Taedongmun, showing how it had been recently enclosed for the Japanese to use.

Historically, Pyongyang had been centred on the Taedongmun up until the period of urban expansion under the Japanese and was also the city's entrance to traffic along the river. Although Korea officially came under Japanese control in 1910, Japanese influence over the peninsular had been increasing in the years prior. In the Russo-Japanese War of 1904 and 1905, the nearby Yeongwangjeong pavilion was converted into a telegraph office whilst Taedongmun was transformed to turn the gate's internal structure into an enclosed usable interior space with walls and windows. The first wooden floor was expanded from one to three sections at the front and doors were added beneath it. To make the space beneath the first wooden floor usable, the upper parts of the six columns were trimmed to increase height. Additionally, a second wooden floor was installed. With Yeongwangjeong, Taedongmun was used for telegraph and postal-related activities and a 1919 map of Pyongyang shows that a telephone exchange was installed for communication between the two sites. Following the Russo-Japanese War, the southern walls of the inner castle were removed up to the Taedongmun. It ultimately survived demolition by the Japanese by being classified as a Grade B in a 1909 survey, meaning it had high architectural value and required special protection to preserve them. Other surviving gates throughout Korea were given an A or B grade. In Pyongyang, the Japanese removed five gates in 1907.

The use of Taedongmun and Yeongwangjeong for government and communication purposes gradually disappeared and the area around the gate became a park in the 1920s. Ownership of the area belonged to the Postal Service who moved the telephone exchange in 1920. Plans for transforming the area into a park were present since the early 1910s and it was officially created in 1923. In the transformation period, many of the buildings around the gate were demolished or relocated, leading to its weakened importance to the growing city, as well as its separation from Pyongyang's road network. The warehouses in from the gate were removed in 1921.As Taedongmun began to be used less actively for long activities, the Japanese began to use it increasingly for temporary activities, such as for holding exhibitions. On 22 May 1923, it and the surrounding area was used for a tank exhibition to commemorate the opening of the Pyongyang tram. On 21 March 1925, artifacts from the theorised ancient Korean Nangnang Kingdom were displayed at the gate. On 24 April 1927, it was used as a display hall for Choson Electric and its use for exhibitions then ceased. In addition to its use as an exhibition hall, the transformation of the Taedongmun area into a park allowed the Taedongmun to become an active tourist site in Japanese Pyongyang to the point it consistently appeared in travel itineraries for the city. As part of the effort to make the Taedongmun a tourist site, the Chilcheung Stone Pagoda was moved in front of the gate. The Pyongyang Bell was also moved in 1927 from its position in front of Taedongmun to the space between Taedongmun and Yeongwangjeong.

In 1934, the "Ten-Year Plan for Major Repairs of Wooden Buildings of National Treasures" was established by the Government-General of Korea to carry out maintenance work on important buildings, including Taedongmun. Restoration work was completed in 1939. The work was not purely about restoring its state, but also about making changes to the lower stone foundation and the treatment of the pavilion layer. The restored structure appeared to be similar to what appeared as in the Pyeongan Gamsahyangyeondo created in the late Joseon period as restoration work sought to restore it to its 'original' form whilst removing most modern alterations.

== Design ==
The current version of the Taedongmun that has existed since 1635 is a two-story gate standing at a total height of 19 metres (62 ft), with a granite embarkment that is 6.5 metres (21 ft) tall, 26.3 metres (86 ft) long and 14.25 metres (46.8 ft) wide. The four corners of the embarkment were designed to gradually widen towards the ground to provide stability to the structure. In the middle of the granite embarkment is the walkway. The Taedongmun's roof is a traditional style with 16 columns. The corner columns are thicker and taller than the columns in the middle, and are also slightly tilted inwards to provide support and withstand the weight of the roof. The structure is a representation of the castle gate architecture of the Joseon Dynasty. It originally had a semi-circular shape akin to the Janganmun Gate of Hwaseong Fortress in South Korea, which allowed the gate to have a defensive function. This was, however, damaged during the Japanese occupation. The second floor of the gate has a plaque of cursive writing by Yang Sa-eon written in the Middle Joseon called "Euphoru".

== See also ==
- National Treasures of North Korea
- Potongmun
