= Kuju Castle =

Goryeo-era fortress in Kusong, North Korea

- Hangul: 구주성
- Hanja: 龜州城
- RR: Gujuseong
- MR: Kujusŏng

The Kuju Castle (Korean: 구주성) is a military fortress from the Goryeo period, located in Kusong, North Korea.

The fortress was the site of the defeat of the Khitan invasion in 1018 under the command of Kang Kam-ch'an. The site is number 60 on the list of National Treasure of North Korea.

== See also ==
- Battle of Kuju
- Siege of Kuju
