= Iron Buddha of Jokjo Temple =

Buddha statue in North Korea

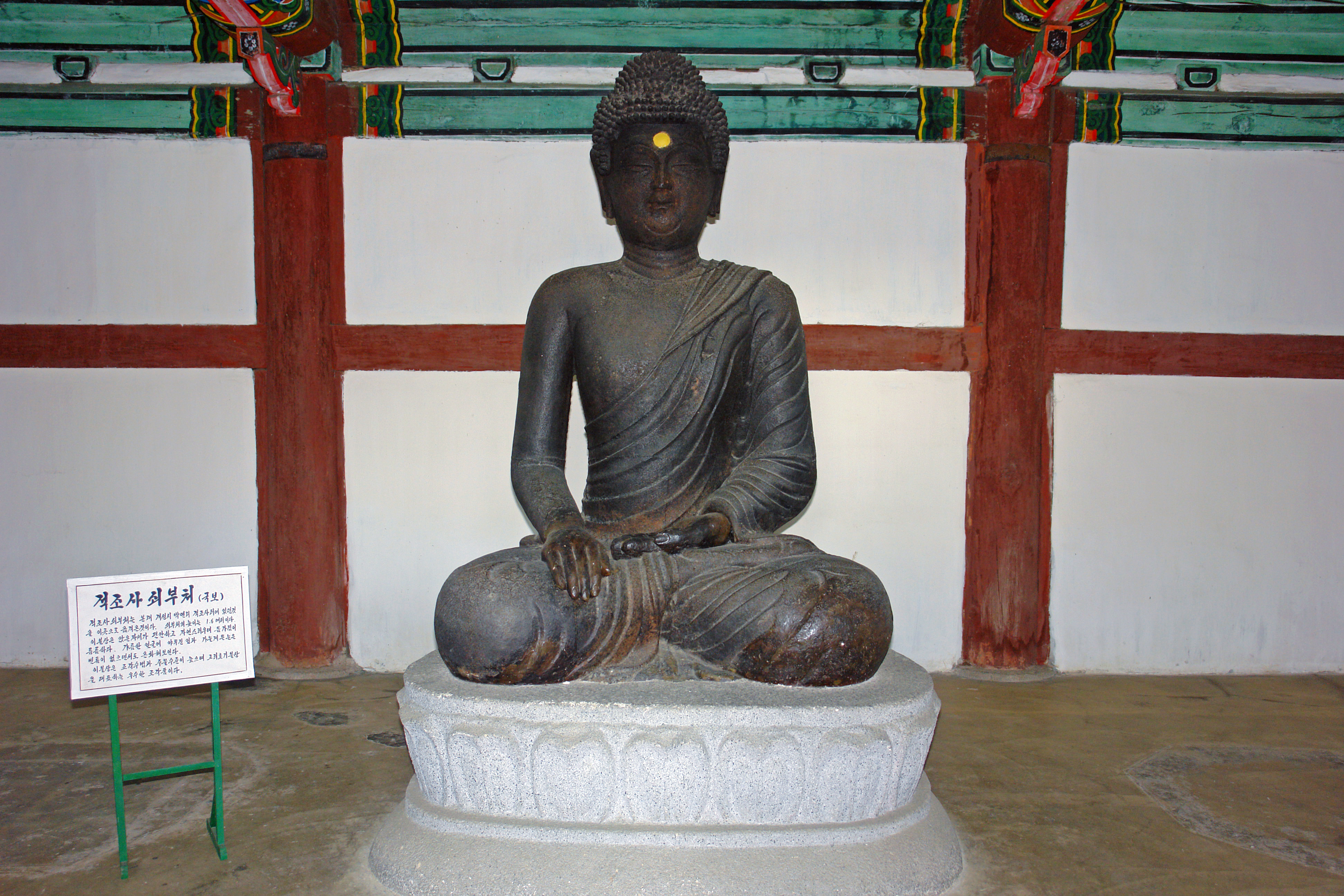

Korean name
- Chosŏn'gŭl: 적조사쇠부처
- Hancha: 寂照寺쇠부처
- Revised Romanization: Jeokjosa-soebucheo
- McCune–Reischauer: Chŏkchosa-soebuch'ŏ

The Iron Buddha of Jokjo Temple is preserved at the Koryo Museum in Kaesong, North Korea. The Buddha statue is located in Showroom Number Three in the Kyesong Temple complex of the Museum. It was moved from the site of the Jokjo Temple which is located in Pakyon-ri, Kaesong.

== History ==
The iron statue depicts a seated Buddha (called 적조사쇠부처 or ch’ŏlbul) and weighs over a ton. It was moved in 1925 from the Chŏkjo-sa temple site (寂照寺) in Kaesŏng Pakyŏn-li to the Kyŏngbuggung Palace museum in Seoul. In September 1935 it returned to the Kaesŏng Provincial Museum, where it was located in the main exhibition hall. Photos exist of the statue with both hands broken off (taken circa 1935 and again in the 1950s), when it was seated on a high pedestal. It now rests in the Museum with both hands restored, sitting on a lower and less decorated granite pedestal.
