= Kwangbopsa =

Temple in Pyongyang, North Korea

Coordinates: 39.0917°N 125.8264°E

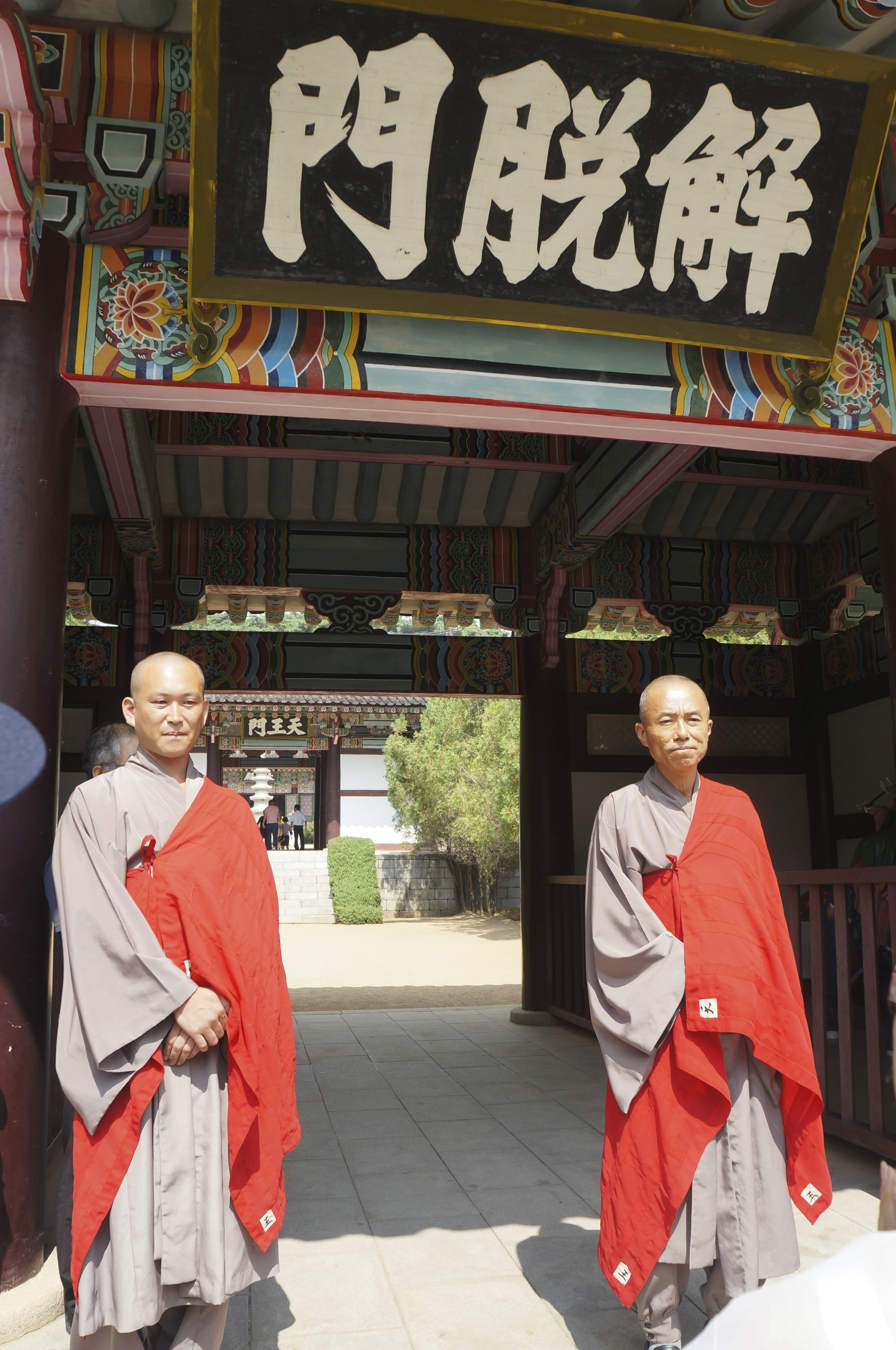
- Monks at the temple

Korean name
- Hangul: 광법사
- Hanja: 廣法寺
- RR: Gwangbeopsa
- MR: Kwangbŏpsa

The Kwangbop Temple is an historic structure located in Mt. Taesong, Pyongyang, North Korea. Built during the early period of Koguryo during the reign of King Kwanggaetho, it is listed as item 164 on the list of National Treasures of North Korea.

== History ==
The temple was built during the reign of Gwanggaeto the Great; it is one of a large number of temples that were built in Pyongyang during this time.

Originally built in 392, it was destroyed by fire in 1700. It was rebuilt and enlarged in 1727. Destroyed again during the Korean War during a bombing of Pyongyang in 1952, it was not rebuilt until 1990. Visiting Buddhist monks are taken for tours here, though some South Koreans claim the residents in the temple are civil servants posing as monks.

In 2007, Buddhists visited the Kwangbopsa Temple as part of a delegation of Catholics, Protestants, Buddhists and Confucians, who are part of the Korean Conference on Religion and Peace, members being from South Korea. The visit was to celebrate the 10th anniversary of partnership with the North Korean government’s Council of Religionists.

== Description ==
The temple is composed of the Haethal Gate, the Chonwang Gate, the Taeung Hall, the east and west Buddhist monasteries and an octagonal five-storied pagoda. Its buildings are arranged symmetrically with the pagoda as the centre.

The Taehung Hall is the main building of the temple. On the Haethal Gate we see carvings of young monks on elephants and lions; on the Chonwang Gate are carvings of four heavenly kings. Preserved within the temple are a lotus pond, a monument to the Kwangbop Temple erected in 1727 and another for the extension and painting of the Kwangbop Temple. The epitaph on the monument to the Kwangbop Temple recounts a legend of nine dragons and the 99 ponds of Mt. Kuryong of Taesong. The complex is built in the typical construction of period, having buildings on three sides centering on a pagoda.
