= Kyongam Pavilion =

- Hangul: 경암루
- Hanja: 景岩樓
- RR: Gyeongamnu
- MR: Kyŏngamnu

Kyongam Pavilion is a garden pavilion built in Sariwon, Hwanghaebukdo in North Korea. The pavilion was built during Joseon Dynasty.

== Overview ==
Kyongam Pavilion was named after the famous attraction, Kyongam mountain, while the pavilion is northern part of hilly area. Famous for its cozy style, it was firstly constructed as the east annext of official building in Bongsan county during Jeongjo of Joseon in 1798. It was later moved to the current site in 1917. Korean War destroyed the pavilion but was restored between 1954 and 1955.

The pavilion faces surrounding mountains around Kyongam mt. and looks over the city with natural scope of the mountain, forming the type of Korean garden.
