= Kumgang County =

Kŭmgang County 금강군
- County

Korean transcription(s)
  - Chosŏn'gŭl: 금강군
  - Hancha: 金剛郡
  - McCune–Reischauer: Kŭmgang-gun
  - Revised Romanization: Geumgang-gun
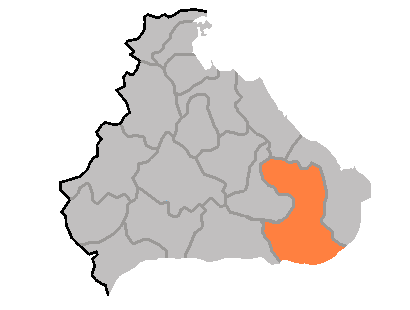
- Map of Kangwon showing the location of Kumgang
- Country: North Korea
- Province: Kangwŏn Province
- Administrative divisions: 1 ŭp, 26 ri

Area
  - Total: 1,009 km^{2} (390 sq mi)

Population (2008 census)
  - Total: 54,211
  - Density: 53.73/km^{2} (139.2/sq mi)

Kŭmgang is a kun, or county, in Kangwŏn province, North Korea. Kŭmgang lies immediately north of the Korean Demilitarized Zone. It was formed in 1952 from a portion of Hoeyang County and from those sections of Yanggu, and Rinje counties that remained under Northern control after the armistice. The county takes its name from the Mount Kŭmgang, which is partially located there. The county seat, Kŭmgang-ŭp, was formerly called Malhwi-ri.

== Geography ==
The Taebaek Mountains pass through the county, reaching their highest point in the Pirobong peak of Kumgangsan. Approximately 85% of the county's area is forestland. Major local streams include the Kŭmgangch'ŏn and Tonggŭmgangch'ŏn.

== Administrative divisions ==
Kŭmgang county is divided into 1 ŭp (town) and 26 ri (villages):

- Kŭmgang-ŭp (formerly Malhwi)
- Anmi-ri
- Ch'ŏngdu-ri
- Hahwi-ri
- Hwach'ŏl-li
- Hyŏl-li
- Hyŏndong-ri
- Ip'o-ri
- Kŭmch'ŏl-li
- Kŭmp'ung-ri
- Mundŭng-ri
- Naegang-ri
- Och'ŏl-li
- Paekhyŏl-li
- Pangmong-ri
- Pukchŏm-ri
- P'ungmi-ri
- Ryongam-ri
- Sedong-ri
- Sin'gyo-ri
- Sin'ŭp-ri
- Sinwŏl-li
- Sogol-li
- Soksa-ri
- Songgŏ-ri
- Sunggap-ri
- Tanp'ung-ri

== Economy ==
The chief local industry is agriculture, with rice and maize the dominant crops. However, arable land takes up only 8.5% of the county's area. Manufacturing and livestock raising also contribute to the local economy. Mining is supported by deposits of gold, tungsten, and quartz.

== See also ==
- Geography of North Korea
- Administrative divisions of North Korea
- Kangwon (North Korea)
- Mount Kumgang
- Mount Kumgang Tourist Region
