= Myogilsang Buddhist statue =

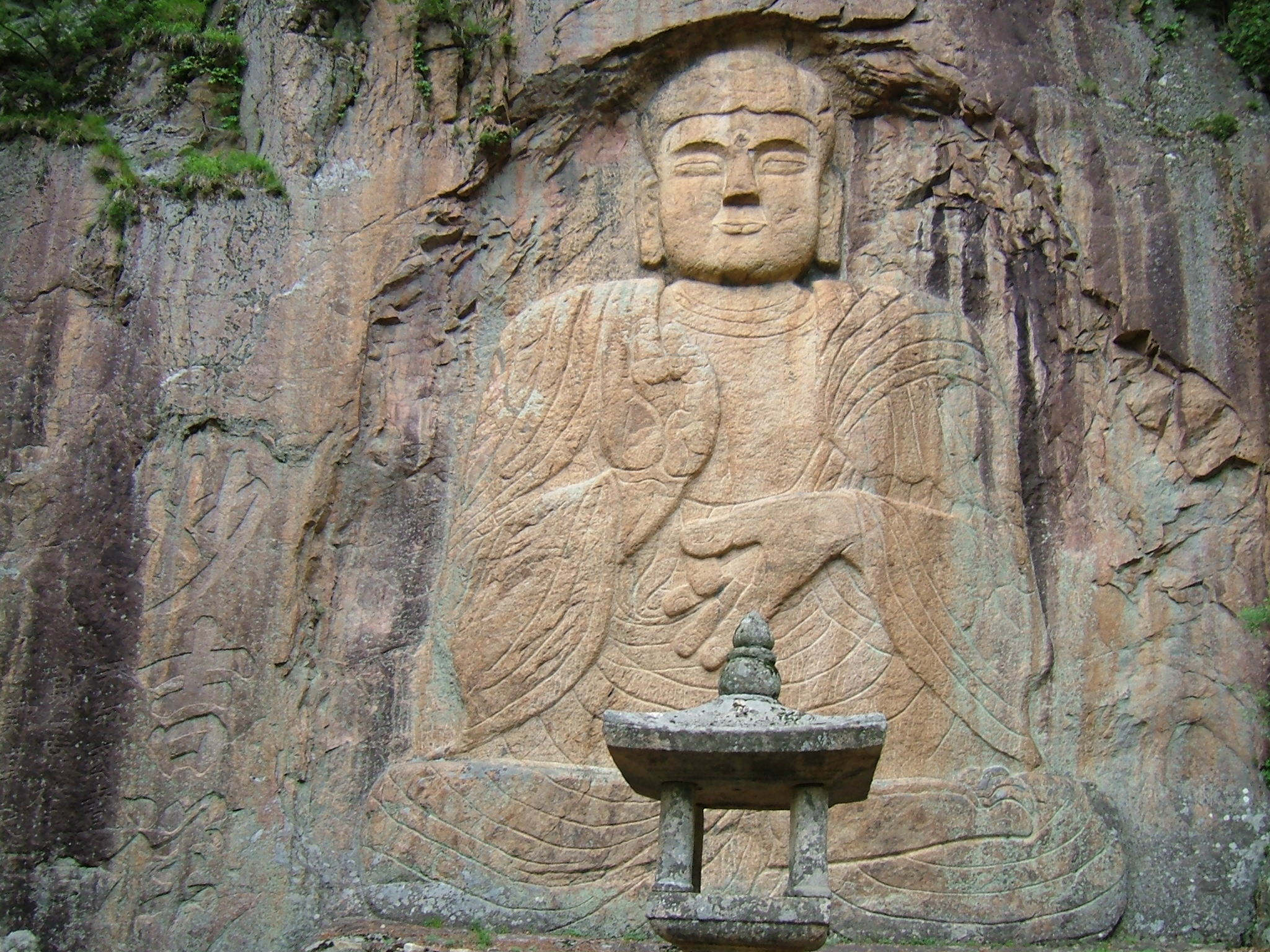
- View of the carving.

Korean name
- Hangul: 묘길상
- Hanja: 妙吉祥
- RR: Myogilsang
- MR: Myogilsang

The Myogilsang Buddhist statue is a carved Bodhisattva located in the Grand Miruk Cliff in Manphok Valley, Inner Kumgang, North Korea. Dating from the Koryo period, it is 15 metres high and 9.4 metres wide. The statue was once part of a larger temple dedicated to Manjushri (the Bodhisattva of wisdom) that was laid to waste in the late-Choson period, leaving only the carving. A painting dated 1768 in the National Museum of Korea in Seoul shows the carving inside the temple.

It is the largest Buddhist stone image in Korea.

The statue was visited by 150 tourists in 2007 as part of a pilot project to open the area to tourism from South Korea.
