= Nyongbyon County =

County in North Pyŏngan Province, North Korea

Coordinates: 39°50′N 125°45′E

Nyŏngbyŏn County 녕변군
- County

Korean transcription(s)
  - Chosŏn'gŭl: 녕변군
  - Hancha: 寧邊郡
  - McCune-Reischauer: Nyŏngbyŏn-gun
  - Revised Romanization: Nyeongbyeon-gun
- Country: North Korea
- Province: North Pyongan
- Administrative divisions: 1 ŭp, 1 workers' district, 26 ri

Area
  - Total: 506.2 km^{2} (195.4 sq mi)

Population (2008)
  - Total: 113,852
  - Density: 224.9/km^{2} (582.5/sq mi)

Nyŏngbyŏn is a county in North Pyŏngan Province, North Korea. It borders the cities of Kaechŏn and Anju, and covers an area of 504 km^{2}.

== Description ==
The city was heavily fortified during the 15th century as a result of its strategic position, and during the Josŏn dynasty, became a retreat for the aristocratic ryangban due to its fantastic scenery. The city's Yaksan, meaning medicine mountain, was well known for its azaleas; the modern poet Kim So-wol wrote one of his best-known poems on this subject. Two other mountains, Yaksan-dongdae, east of Yaksan, and Moran Hill are also scenic spots. Nyŏngbyŏn also houses many important relics, including the Chŏnju and Sound Buddhist temples, dating from 1345 and 1684 respectively; the Ryuksung Pavilion, famous for "six scenic views" of Nyŏngbyŏn; and the Ch'ŏl'ong Castle, built to protect the city during the Ri dynasty. The south gate of Nyŏngbyŏn, called Mannomun, is also nearby.

== Administrative divisions ==
Nyŏngbyŏn county is divided into 1 ŭp (town), 1 rodongjagu (workers' district) and 26 ri (villages):

- Nyŏngbyŏn-ŭp (녕변읍)
- Pharwŏn-rodongjagu (팔원로동자구)
- Hacho-ri (하초리)
- Hwaphyŏng-ri (화평리)
- Kosŏng-ri (고성리)
- Kuhang-ri (구항리)
- Kusan-ri (구산리)
- Kwanha-ri (관하리)
- Mangil-ri (망일리)
- Myŏngdŏk-ri (명덕리)
- Namdŭng-ri (남등리)
- Namsan-ri (남산리)
- Obong-ri (오봉리)
- Okchang-ri (옥창리)
- Pongsan-ri (봉산리)
- Ryongchu-ri (룡추리)
- Ryonghwa-ri (룡화리)
- Ryongpho-ri (룡포리)
- Ryongsŏng-ri (룡성리)
- Sejuk-ri (세죽리)
- Sŏha-ri (서하리)
- Songgang-ri (송강리)
- Songhwa-ri (송화리)
- Sŏsan-ri (서산리)
- Sŏwi-ri (서위리)
- Taejŏn-ri (대전리)
- Tongnam-ri (동남리)
- Yŏnha-ri (연하리)

== Economy ==
The Nyŏngbyŏn Nuclear Scientific Research Centre, a major component of the North Korean nuclear program, is located here.

== Transportation ==
The Chŏngnyŏn Pharwŏn Line of the Korean State Railway passes through Nyŏngbyŏn county.

== See also ==
- Administrative divisions of North Korea
- Geography of North Korea
