= Yongmyong Temple =

Former Buddhist temple in Pyongyang, North Korea

Coordinates: 39.0415°N 125.7620°E

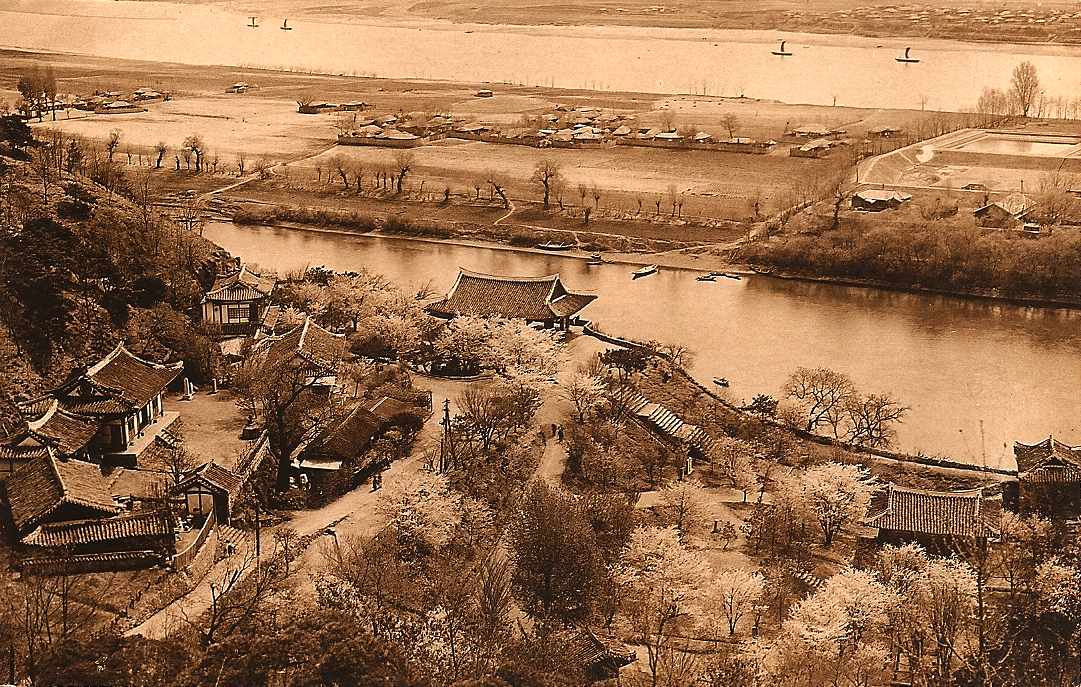
- Yongmyong Temple in the 1930s

Korean name
- Hangul: 영명사
- Hanja: 永明寺
- RR: Yeongmyeongsa
- MR: Yŏngmyŏngsa

Yongmyong Temple (Korean: 영명사) was a Korean Buddhist temple located at the foot of Moranbong hill in Pyongyang, North Korea. Prior to its destruction in the Korean War, it was the largest and most important center of Buddhist worship in Pyongyang. It is unknown when the temple was founded, but it is popularly believed to be from the end of the Goguryeo period. During the Japanese colonial period, the temple was called Eimei-ji in Japanese.

== History ==
Though it is unknown when the temple was founded, popular tales date it to the end of the Goguryeo period. The temple was completely rebuilt under the Joseon dynasty. Under the Japanese occupation of Korea, the temple became a major tourist site in Pyongyang and was renowned for its beautiful riverside location and many cherry trees. In the 1920s it again underwent an extensive restoration funded by the Japanese government, who also officially changed its name to the Japanese reading of its Hanja: "Eimei-ji". During that time, the temple was also confiscated from by the government, and given for use as a headquarters for the Rinzai sect of Japanese Zen Buddhism. The Rinzai monks were tasked with converting the citizens away from traditional Korean Buddhism as part of a government program to replace the old Korean culture with that of modern Japan.

The historic temple was destroyed during the U.S. carpet bombings of Pyongyang during the Korean War. The only building of the temple now standing is Pubyŏk Pavilion, a scenic lookout which was reconstructed after the war and was known for its beautiful views of the Taedong River; its stone pagoda and octagonal shrine also survived the bombings, and all three are registered as National Treasures of North Korea.

The temple ran the Pobun Hermitage, located on Mt. Ryongak in Mangyŏngdae-guyŏk.

In 2012 the Korean Central News Agency reported the "reconfirmation" of Lair of King Tongmyong's Unicorn, 200 metres (660 ft) from Yongmyongsa. The discovery is credited to the History Institute of the DPRK, and the report states that "Unicorn Lair" is carved on a rock at the site. The report of the discovery also states this "proves that Pyongyang was a capital city of Ancient Korea".
