= Tonggun Pavilion =

Coordinates: 40°12′14.5″N 124°31′46.6″E

- Hangul: 통군정
- Hanja: 統軍亭
- RR: Tonggunjeong
- MR: T'onggunjŏng

Tonggun Pavilion (Korean: 통군정) is the hall located in Uiju county, North Pyongan Province of North Korea. The pavilion faces Liaoning Province, China right forward. The formation of the building seems like square.

== History ==
=== Introduction ===
The book called Imsahong-gi (임사홍기) written in 991 says the exact year of establishment. Almost 6 centuries later, Junjong of Joseon re-established the pavilion in 1538, where seriously destroyed during Korean War in the 20th century. Later the pavilion was restored.

=== Description ===
The Pavilion is located on the peak of Samgaksan along the banks of the Amnok River. The pavilion was reconstructed in 1478 and was repaired in 1538 and again on several other occasions. It now looks as it did in the 15th century. The Pavilion has four open sections measuring 14.41 meters at the front of the complex and four open sections measuring 11.85 meters along both sides. It is a seven cross-beam building with "flower spray ornamentation at the top of each column". The roof is a double-eave hip-saddled roof with broad gables. The KCNA has described it as follows: "The Thonggun Pavilion is a valuable heritage showing pavilion architecture in the early period of the Ri Dynasty."

The official South Korean Tourism website describes it as follows: "A raised gazebo used to direct the military in Uiju-eup, Uiju-gun, Pyeonganbuk-do. It is unclear when it was built, but a record of it exists in the ‘Imsahonggi’, a book published in 990 (8th year of King Seongjong’s rule, Goryeo era). Therefore, it is believed to be an early Goryeo structure. It was rebuilt in 1538 and repaired in 1823. If you climb Tonggunjeong, you can see Uijuseong Fortress and Aprokgang River all in one glance. It is North Korea’s National Treasure #11(actually #51)".

It belongs to 8 famous spots of northwest Korea while designated as treasure no. 51 of North Korea.
