= Pyongyang Bell =

National Treasure of North Korea

Coordinates: 39.0228°N 125.7569°E

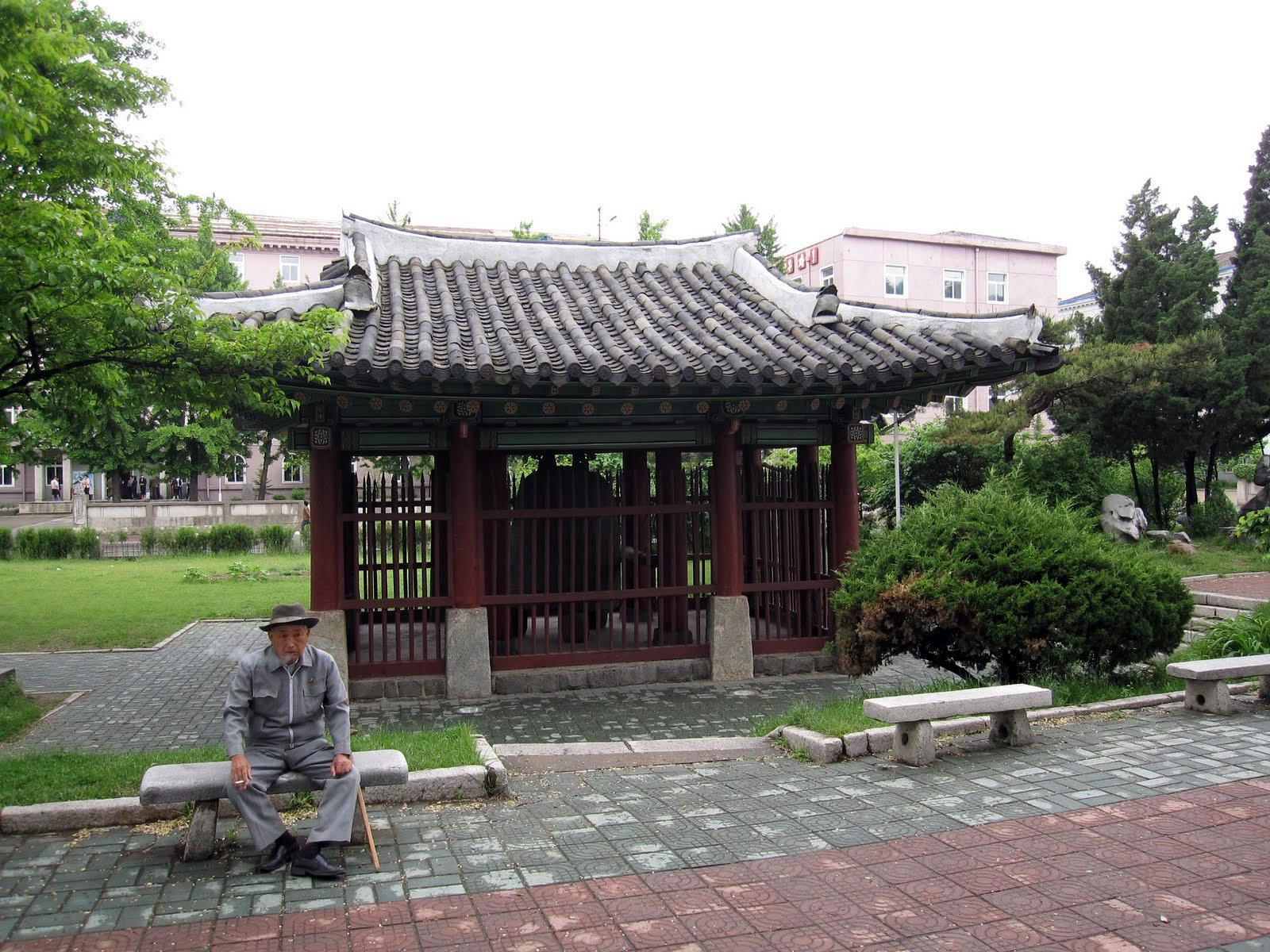

Korean name
- Chosŏn'gŭl: 평양종
- Hancha: 平壤鐘
- Revised Romanization: Pyeongyangjong
- McCune–Reischauer: P'yŏngyangjong

The Pyongyang Bell (Korean: 평양종) is one of the National Treasures of North Korea.

The current bell was cast between June and September 1726 during the Ri dynasty to replace an earlier one that was destroyed by fire in 1714. The bell was rung to announce invasions, natural disasters, New Year's Day and other major events. In 1925, the bell was located on East Gate Street, inside the great East Gate of the city of Pyongyang.

== Details ==
The bell is 3.1 m in height with a diameter at the mouth of 1.6 m. It weighs around 13 000 kg. The metal is 24 cm thick. It is made mostly of bronze, but contains 35 different metals. A detailed record was kept on the casting of the bell. According to a 1925 report, the metals required to cast the bell were collected among various local groups; the Government Treasury exchanged zinc for 1500 pounds of unrefined copper, also added was 3573 pounds and 4 yang of old coin metal, 341 pounds of tin, 2120 pounds of old broken bell metal. The government warehouse supplied 382 pounds of lead and brass. The War Department contributed 370 pounds 5 yang of copper vessels and 29 pounds 13 yang of refined copper. Merchants from Seoul contributed old iron vessels equal to 1296 pounds and 8 yang. The various sub-prefectures of the country gave 1268 pounds and 8 yang of old coin metal. Local priests contributed 282 pounds and 5 yang of iron. Merchants of the country gave 4161 pounds and 8 yang of wrought iron, 1000 pounds and 12 yang of refined copper. The various prefectures throughout Korea exchanged their surplus grain for 4810 pounds and 8 yang of lead and old coin metal.
