= Sungin Hall =

Shrine in Pyongyang, North Korea

Coordinates: 39°01′29″N 125°45′04″E

- Hangul: 숭인전
- Hanja: 崇仁殿
- RR: Sunginjeon
- MR: Sunginjŏn

Sungin Hall (Korean: 숭인전; Hanja: 崇仁殿) built in 1325 as a shrine during the Goryeo Dynasty, the hall can be found in Pyongyang, opposite the Sungnyong Hall. The Hall is notable for its traditional Korean architecture, and was unfortunately heavily damaged during the 1950-1953 Korean War.

Originally, the hall included 10 another wings including annexes, grand gates (in each directions) and quarters. During Korean War, several annexes were demolished yet quarter and grate gate were restored, which was finally moved to the current site.

Built during Goryeo Dynasty, the hall shows the characteristics of architectural style during 14th century of Korea. A gable roof was decorated with beautiful dancheong, multicolored paintwork on wooden building. It is a notable feature that pillars in the corner comes forward compared to those in center, with a view to hold the stability of the building.
