= Historic Monuments and Sites in Kaesong =

UNESCO World Heritage Site
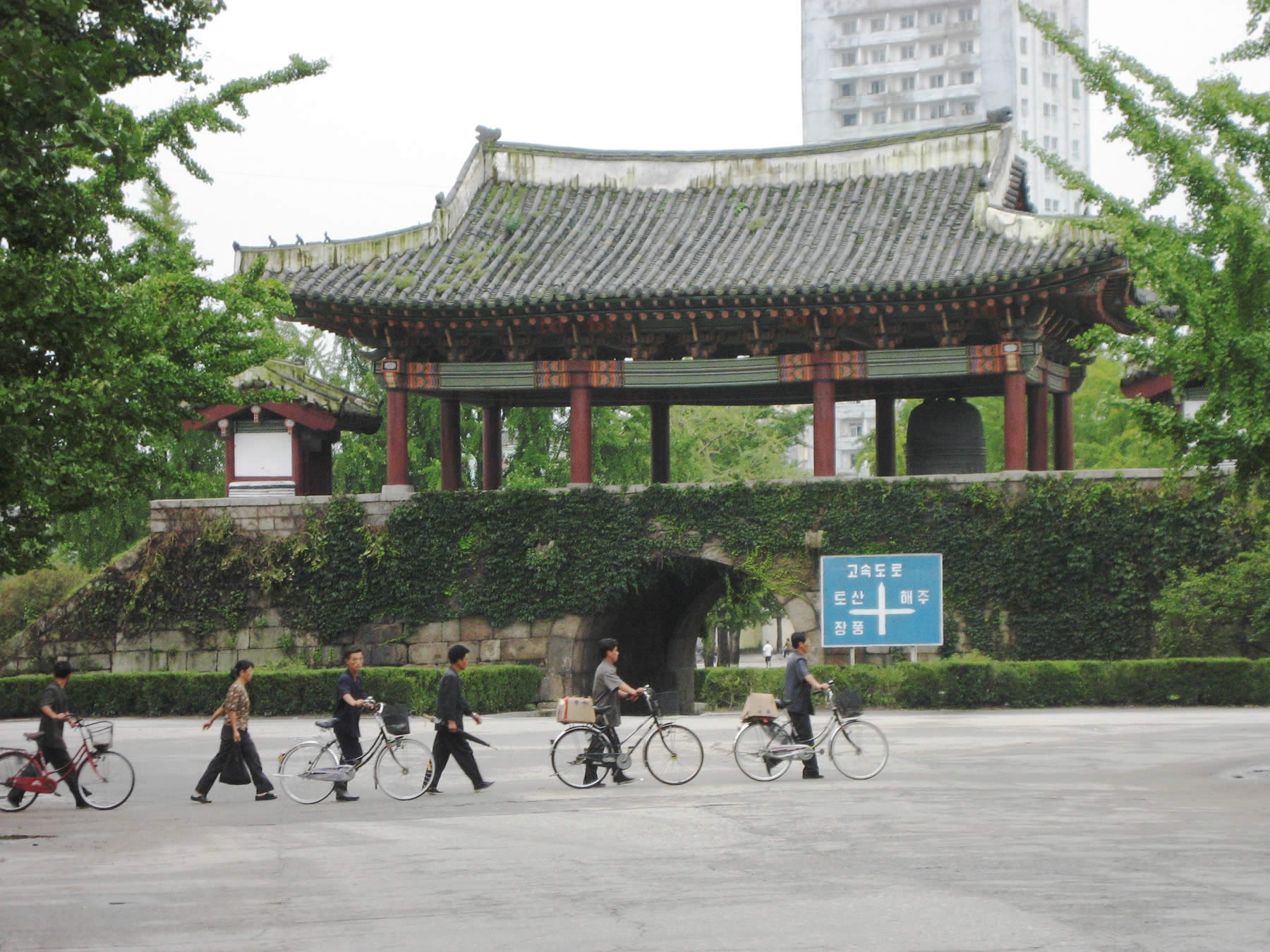
- Kaesong Namdae Gate
- Interactive map of Historic Monuments and Sites in Kaesong
- Location: Kaesong, North Hwanghae Province, North Korea
- Includes: Manwoldae Palace, Kaesong Chomsongdae, Kaesong Walls, Kaesong Namdae Gate, Koryo Songgyungwan, Sungyang Sowon, Sonjuk Bridge and Phyochung Monuments, Mausoleum of King Wang Kon
- Criteria: Cultural: ii, iii
- Reference: 1278rev
- Inscription: 2013 (37th Session)
- Area: 494.2 ha (1,221 acres)
- Buffer zone: 5,222.1 ha (12,904 acres)
- Coordinates: 37°58′54″N 126°30′29″E

Historic Monuments and Sites in Kaesong is a UNESCO World Heritage Site in Kaesong, North Korea. The site consists of 12 separate components, which together testify to the history and culture of the Koryo Dynasty from the 10th to 14th centuries. The geomantic layout of the former capital city of Kaesong, its palaces, institutions and tomb complex, defensive walls and gates embody the political, cultural, philosophical and spiritual values of a crucial era in the region's history. The monuments inscribed also include an astronomical and meteorological observatory, two schools (including one dedicated to educating national officials) and commemorative steles. The site testifies to the transition from Buddhism to neo-Confucianism in East Asia and to the assimilation of the cultural, spiritual, and political values of the states that existed prior to Korea's unification under the Koryo Dynasty. The integration of Buddhist, Confucian, Taoist and geomantic concepts is manifest in the planning of the site and the architecture of its monuments. The World Heritage Site was inscribed on the World Heritage List in 2013 under criteria (ii) and (iii). The site has an area of 494.2 ha with a buffer zone of 5,222.1 ha.

== Components ==
12 separate components comprise the site. Five of these are part of the larger Kaesong Walls.

	Component		Image
1	Manwoldae Palace and Kaesong Chomsongdae		
2	Kaesong Walls	Palocham Wall; Outer Wall; Inner Wall; part of the Kaesong Walls; part of the Kaesong Walls	
3	Kaesong Namdae Gate		
4	Koryo Songgyungwan		
5	Sungyang Sowon		
6	Sonjuk Bridge and Phyochung Monuments		
7	Mausoleum of King Wang Kon		
8	Mausoleum of King Kongmin		
