= Seonggyungwan (disambiguation) =

Seonggyungwan was the foremost educational institution in Seoul, Joseon Dynasty.

Seonggyungwan may also refer to:

- Songgyungwan, the foremost educational institution in Kaesong, Goryeo and Joseon Dynasties
- Koryo Songgyungwan University, an educational institution in Kaesong, North Korea
- Sungkyunkwan University, an educational institution in Seoul and Suwon, South Korea
- Sungkyunkwan University Station, metro station in Seoul, South Korea
