= Sungyang Academy =

Coordinates: 37°58′26″N 126°34′04″E

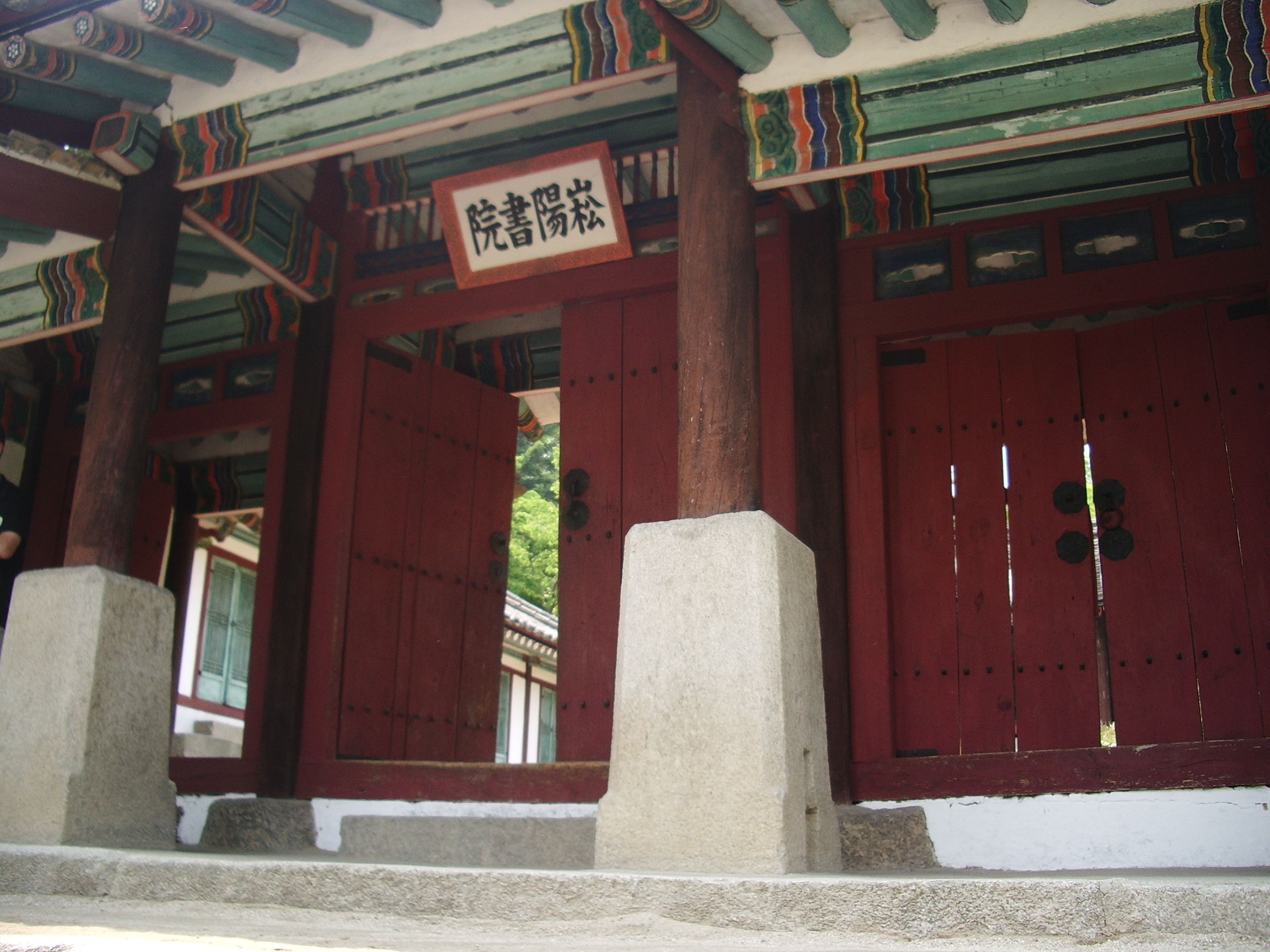

Korean name
- Hangul: 숭양서원
- Hanja: 崧陽書院
- RR: Sungyang seowon
- MR: Sungyang sŏwŏn

Sungyang Hall is a fourteenth-century Confucian academy located on the side of Mt. Janam in Kaesong, North Korea. The hall was constructed in the late fourteenth century for the home of the famously loyal statesman and Confucian scholar Chŏng Mong-ju, whose 1392 assassination by the agents of the later Taejo of Joseon marked the end of the Koryo dynasty. In 1573, the building was transformed into a Confucian academy.

The building is listed as National Treasures #128 in North Korea. It is part of the Historic Monuments and Sites in Kaesong, which became a Unesco World Heritage site in 2013.

== See also ==
- Chŏng Mong-ju
- National Treasures of North Korea
