= Kaesong =

Special city in North Korea

Kaesong 개성
- Special city

Korean transcription(s)
  - Chosŏn'gŭl: 개성특별시
  - Hancha: 開城特別市
  - McCune–Reischauer: Kaesŏng-T'ŭkpyŏlsi
  - Revised Romanization: Gaeseong-Teukbyeolsi
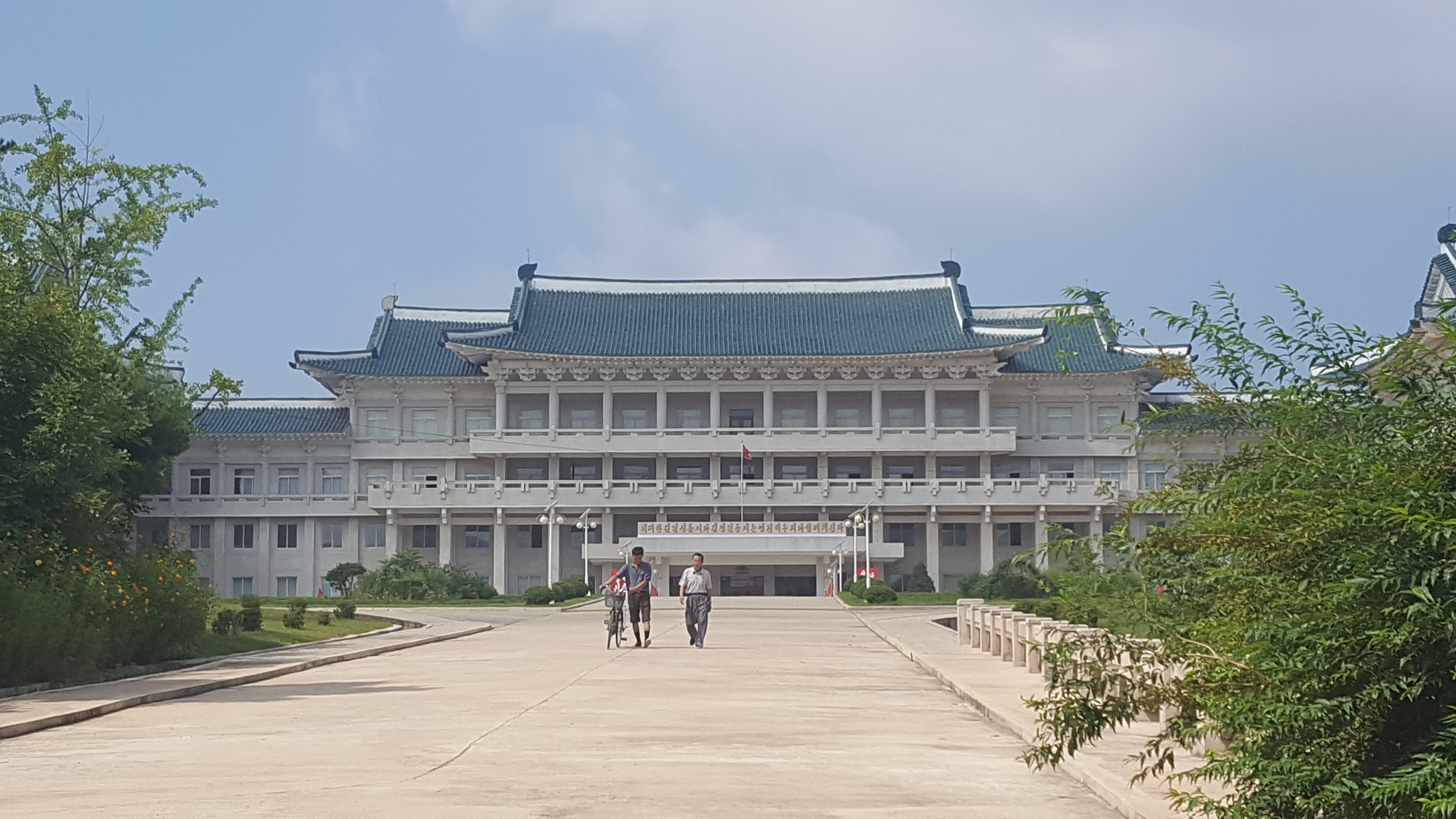
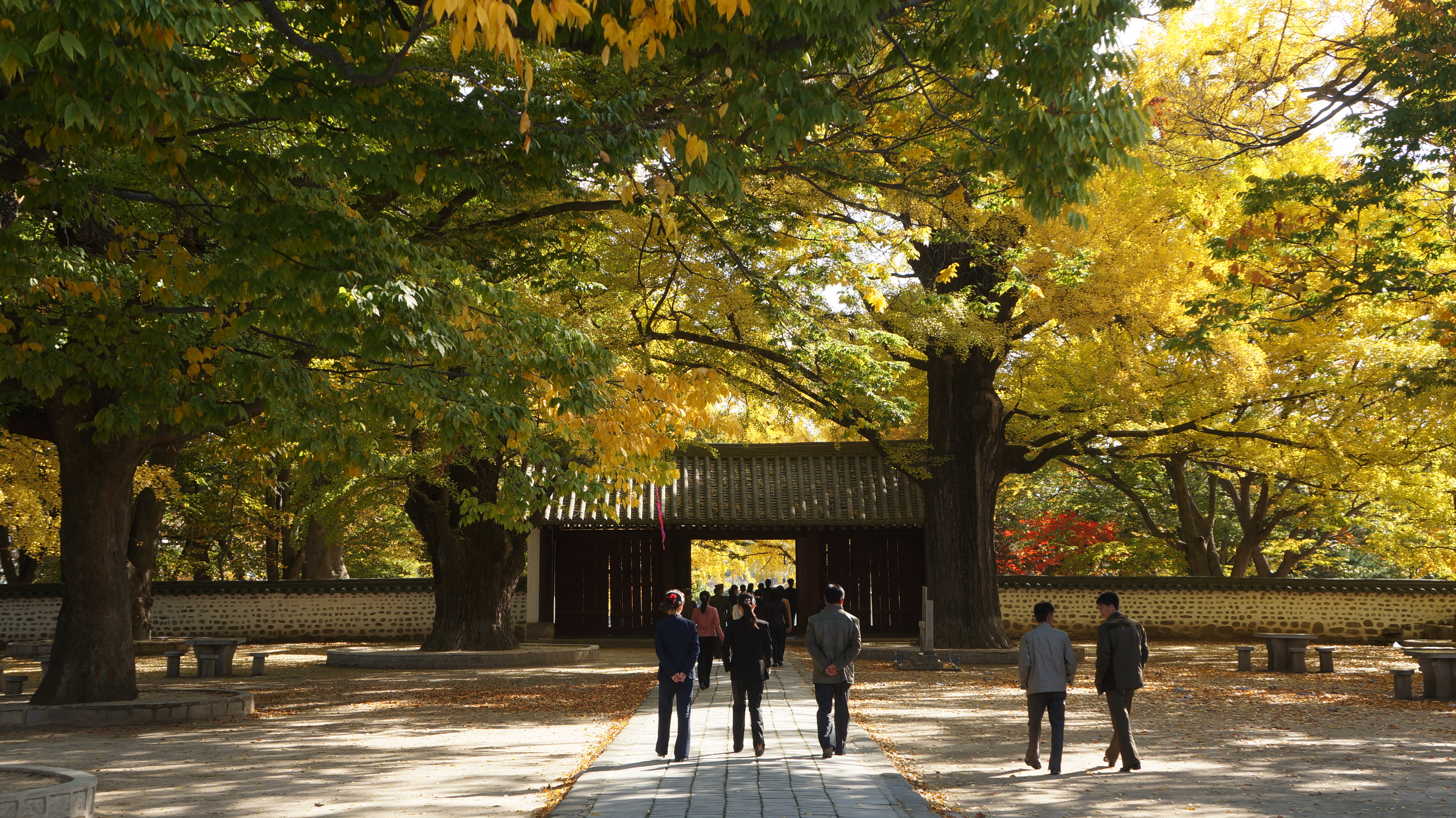
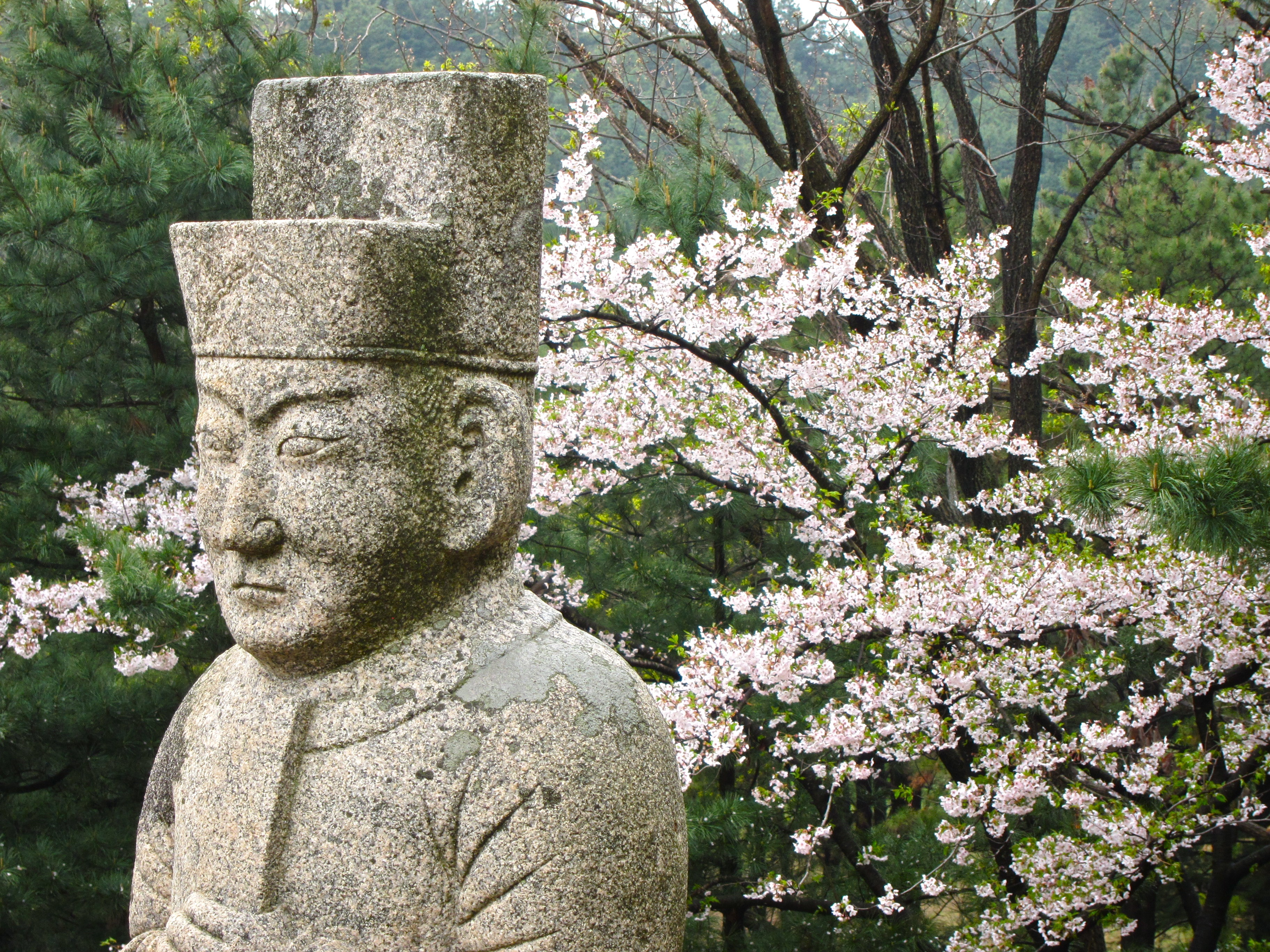
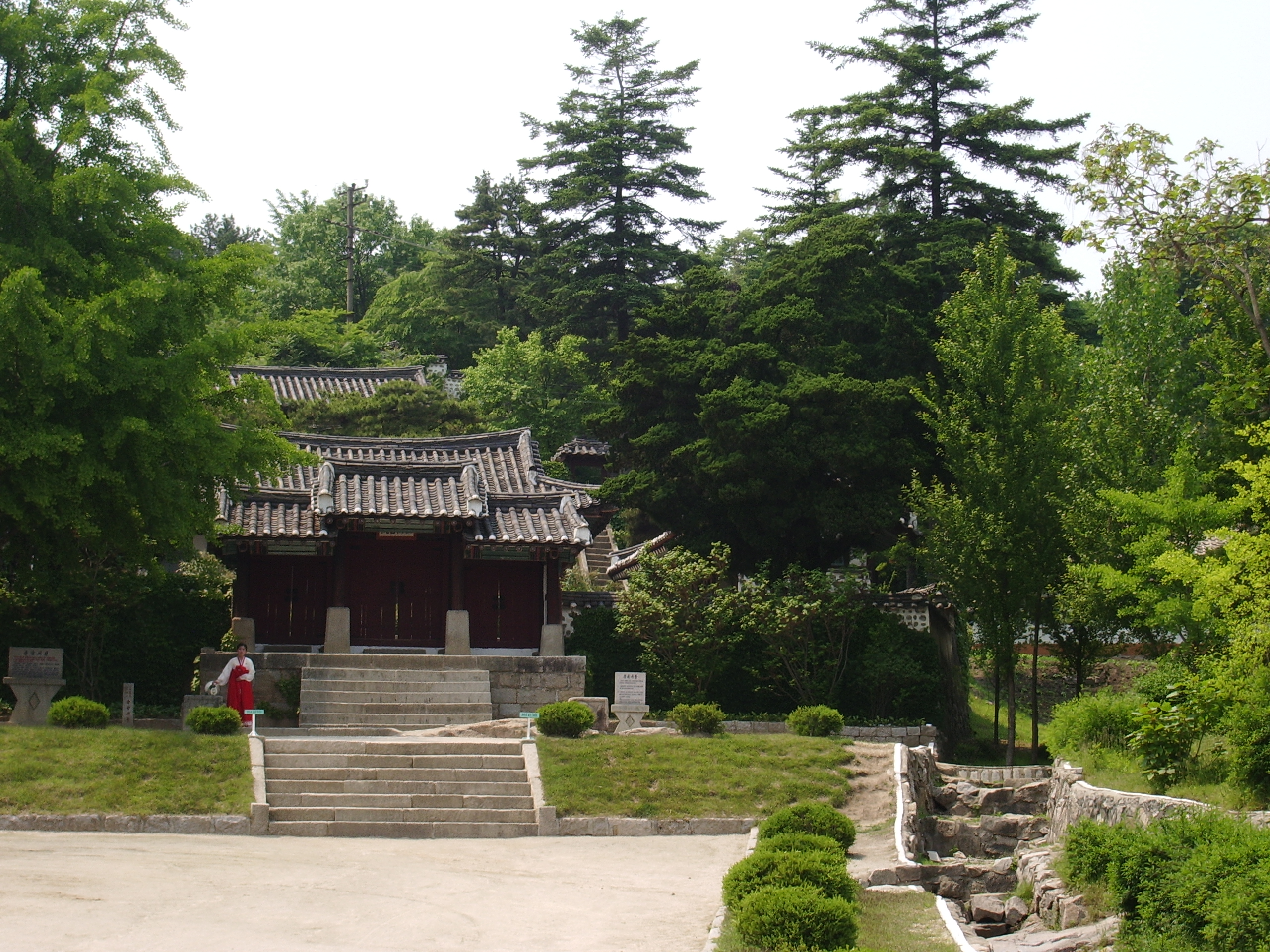
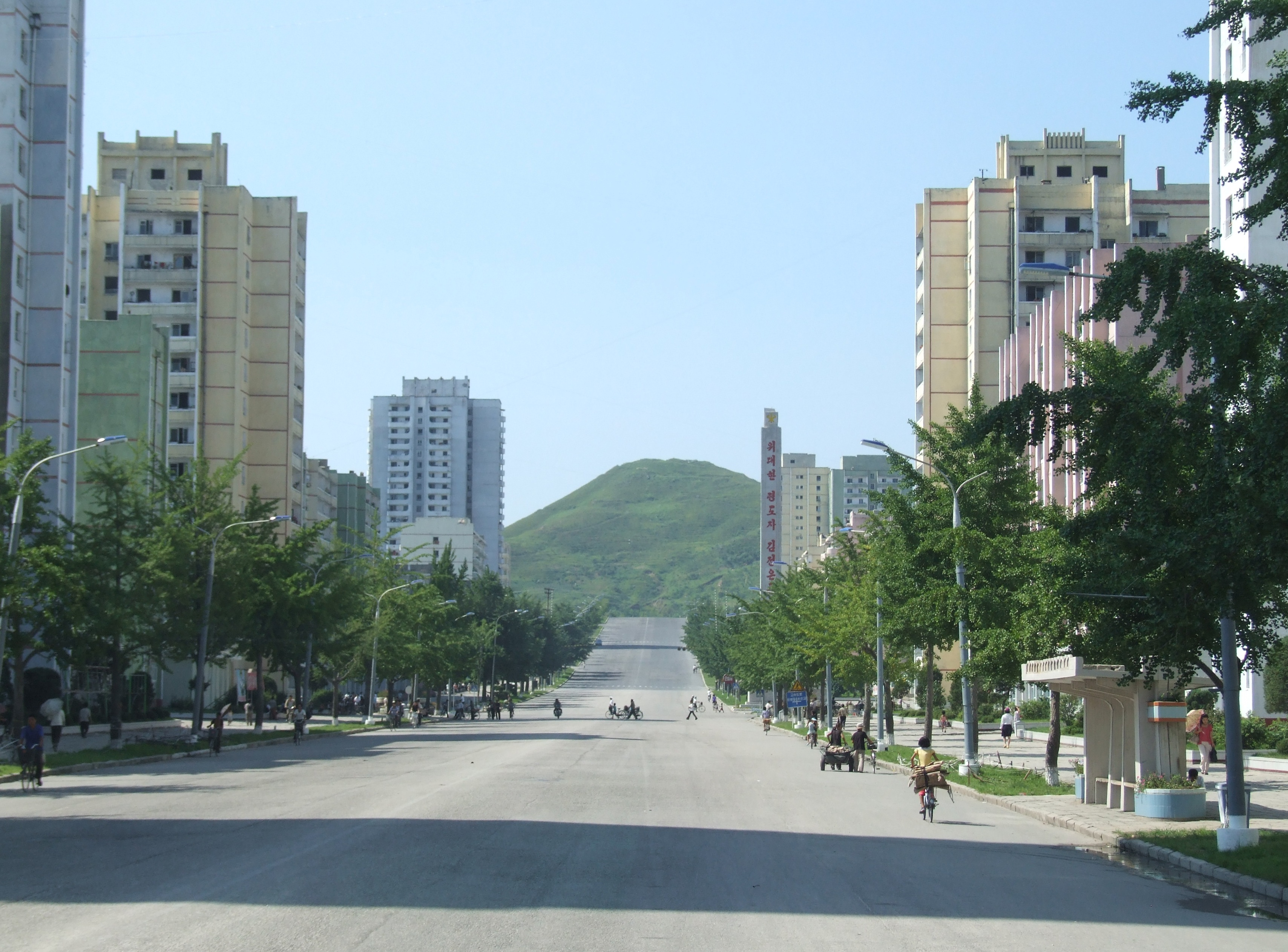
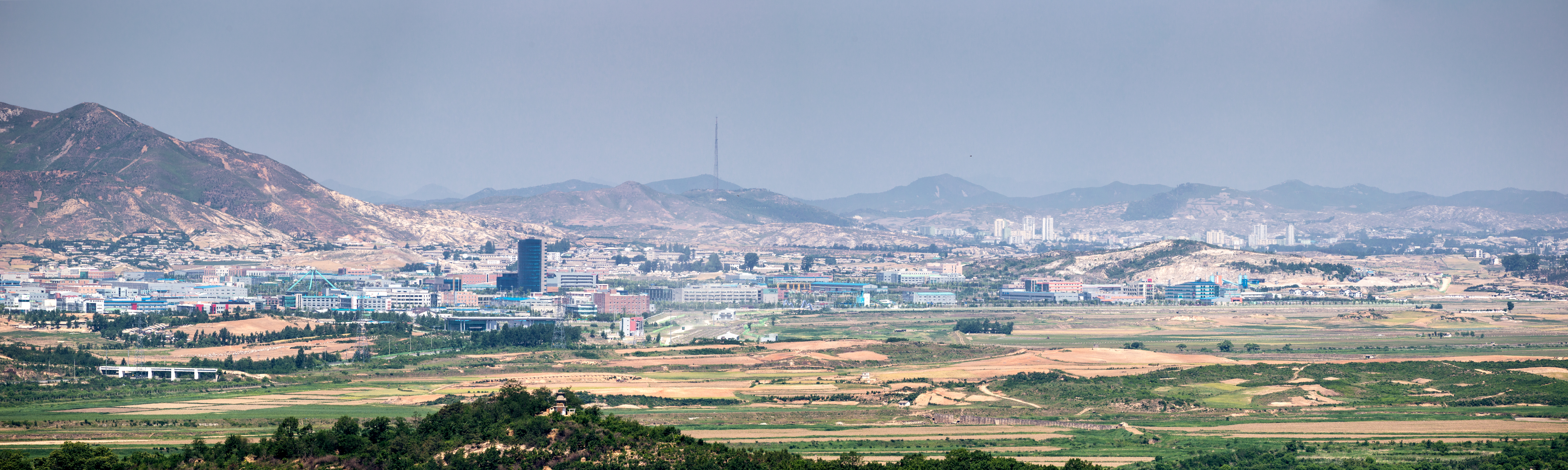
- Koryo Songgyungwan University Fall foliage in Kaesong Mausoleum of King Kongmin Sungyang Academy Street in Kaesong Skyline of Kaesong Industrial Region and downtown Kaesong
- Nickname: "City of Pines" (송도; 松都; Songdo)
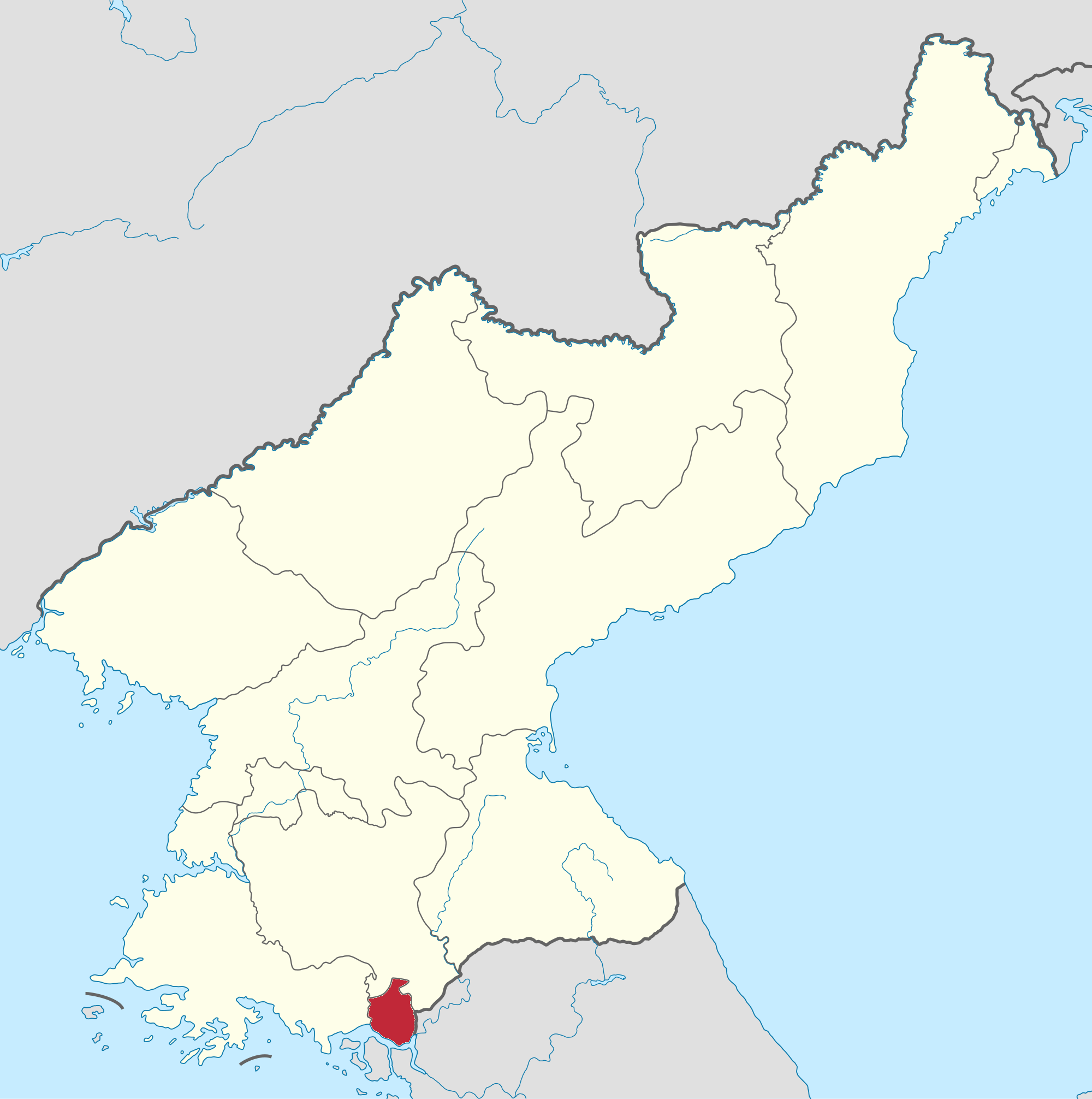
- Kaesong location within North Korea
- Interactive map of Kaesong
- Location within North Korea
- Coordinates: 37°58′18″N 126°33′10″E
- Country: North Korea
- Province: Kaesong
- Settled: c. 700
- Administrative divisions: 24 dong, 3 ri

Government
  - Municipal Party Committee Chief Secretary: Kim Young-gyu (WPK)
  - Municipal People's Committee Chairman: Choi Kyung-nam

Area
  - Total: 179.26 km^{2} (69.21 sq mi)

Population (2009)
  - Total: 192,578
  - Density: 1,074.3/km^{2} (2,782.4/sq mi)
  - Dialect: Gyeonggi
- Time zone: UTC+9 (Pyongyang Time)
- Other information: Split from Gyeonggi in 1951; joined North Hwanghae in 2003. Left North Hwanghae and became special city in 2019.

Kaesong (Note: In the 19th century, Kaesong was also spelled Kaï-seng.) (UK: /keɪˈsɒŋ/, US: /keɪˈsɔːŋ/; Korean: [kɛ.sɔŋ]) is a special city in the southern part of North Korea (formerly in North Hwanghae Province), and the capital of Korea during the Taebong kingdom and subsequent Goryeo dynasty. The city is near the Kaesong Industrial Region close to the border with South Korea and contains the remains of the Manwoldae palace. Called Songdo while it was the ancient capital of Goryeo, the city prospered as a trade centre that produced Korean ginseng. Kaesong now functions as North Korea's light industry centre.

During the Japanese occupation from 1910 to 1945, the city was known by the Japanese pronunciation of its name, "Kaijō". Between 1945 and 1950, Kaesong was under American, and later South Korean, control. During the Korean War, North Korea captured the city, and the 1953 Korean Armistice Agreement left the city under North Korean control. Due to the city's proximity to the border with South Korea, Kaesong has hosted cross-border economic exchanges between the two countries as well as the jointly run Kaesong Industrial Region.

As of 2009, the city had a population of 192,578.

== History ==
The earliest archaeological signs of habitation in the Kaesong area date from the Neolithic era. Artifacts such as Jeulmun pottery, stone ware, and stone axes have been excavated from Osongsan and Kaesong Rasong, the double-walled fortress of Kaesong. As Kaesong has been occupied by various states throughout centuries, its name has changed. It was in the realm of the Mahan confederacy, and was referred to as Busogap during the Goguryeo era. Before the strength of Baekje reverted to the southwest - specifically to Jungnyeong, Mungyeong Saejae, and Asan Bay in 475 - the area had been a part of Baekje for about 100 years.

However, it became a part of the Silla empire in 555, the 16th year of Jinheung of Silla's reign, and its name was changed to Song'ak-gun sometime during this period. According to the Samguk Sagi, when a castle was built at the site in 694, the third year of Hyoso of Silla's reign, Kaesong was referred to as "Song'ak (송악; 松嶽)". Therefore, it is assumed that the name Song'ak had been in use since some time before then.

=== Goryeo ===
Silla began to decline in the late 9th century, and a period of rival warlords ensued. In 898, Kaesong fell under the hand of Gung Ye, the founder of his short-lived state, Taebong, and then became a part of Goryeo in 919 at the hand of its’ founder, Wang Geon, who was enthroned as Taejo of Goryeo. Taejo established the capital to the south of Song'ak, and incorporated Kaesong’s name into Song'ak by calling it "Gaeju". In 919, Kaesong became the national capital. In 960, the 11th year of Gwangjong of Goryeo's reign, the city was renamed Gaegyeong, and in 995, the 14th year of Seonjong of Goryeo's reign, it was called "Gaesong-bu" in reference to the local districts of Song'ak-gun and Gaesong-gun, which are different from the region of the pre-1945 Gaesong-ri, Seo-myeon, Kaepung-gun area. In 1010, the first year of Hyeonjong of Goryeo's reign, the palace and houses were almost burnt down during the second conflict in the Goryeo–Khitan War, and so in 1018, Gaesong-bu was downgraded under "bu" system, and came to govern the three local areas known as “hyeons” - Jeongju, Deoksu, and Gangeum.

In the late 12th century, there was instability in both the government and the countryside. A slave named Manjŏk (or Manjeok) (만적; 萬積) led some other slaves who gathered outside Kaesong in 1198. The revolt plot was suppressed by Ch'oe Ch'ung-hŏn. When Yi Song-gye overthrew Goryeo in 1392 and established Joseon as Taejo of Joseon, he moved the Korean capital from Kaesong to Hanyang (modern-day Seoul) in 1394.

=== 20th century ===
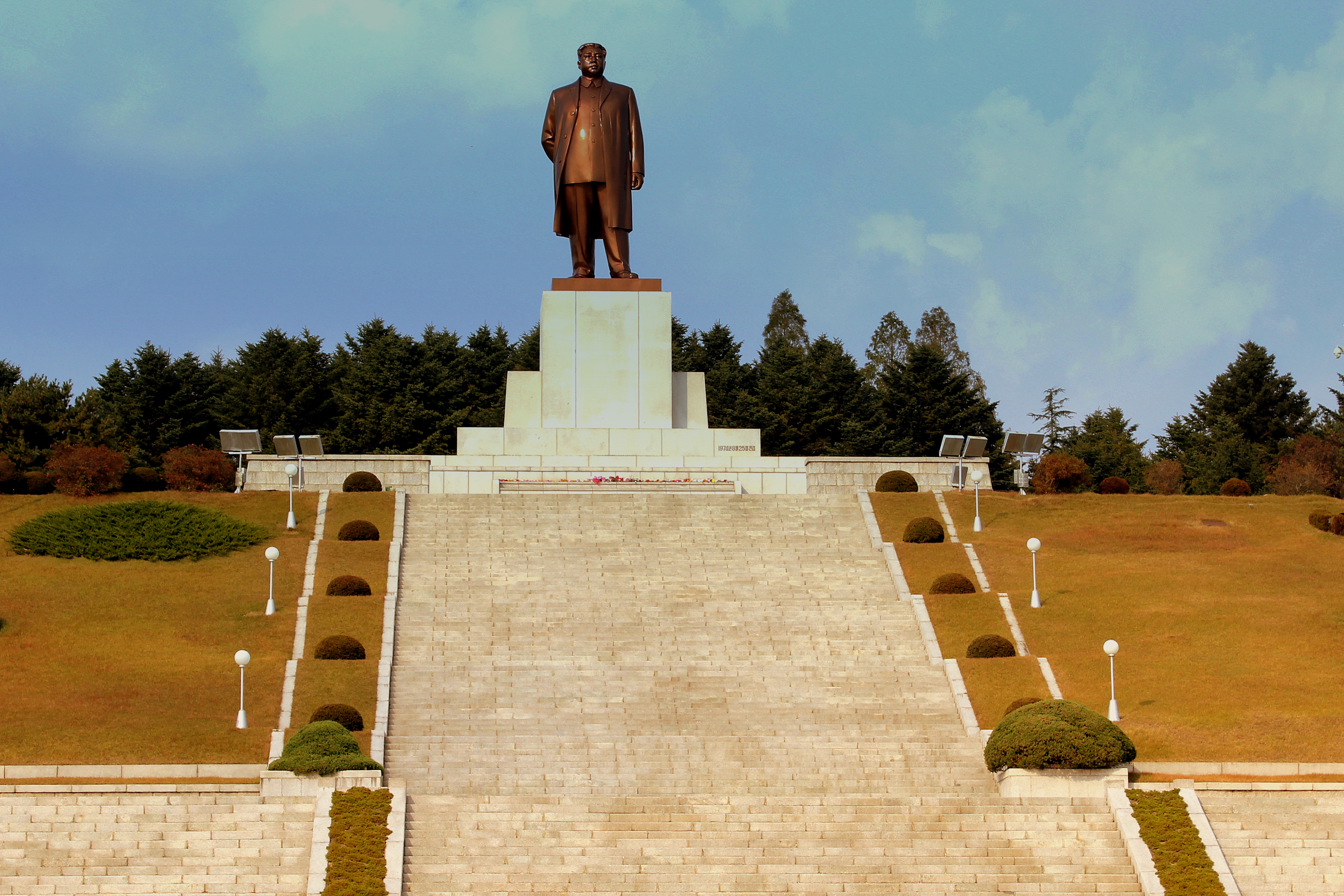
Kim Il Sung statue in Kaesong, as it appeared in October 2012. The statue has since been updated and a statue of Kim Jong Il has been added next to the Kim Il-sung statue.

Kaesong remained a part of Gyeonggi Province until the Korean War. When Korea was partitioned at the 38th parallel after World War II, most of Kaesong's territory was at the south of the border (inside South Korea). In contrast, a small portion to the north was within North Korea. However, the battle of Kaesong-Munsan was won by the Korean People's Army (KPA) in the first days of the Korean War. UN Forces recaptured the city on 9 October 1950 during the pursuit of the KPA that followed the successful Inchon landings. UN Forces abandoned the city on 16 December 1950 during the withdrawal to the Imjin River following the Chinese People's Volunteer Army intervention in the war. Kaesong would remain under Chinese/North Korean control until the end of the war.

Ceasefire negotiations began in Kaesong on 10 July 1951, but were moved to Panmunjom, southeast of the city, on 25 October 1951. The Korean Armistice Agreement signed on 27 July 1953 recognised North Korean control over Kaesong making it the only city to change control from South Korea to North Korea as a result of the war. Postwar Kaesong and the part of Kyonggi Province that came to be occupied was organized into "Kaesong Region" (Kaesŏng Chigu; 개성 지구; 開城 地區). In 1957, Kaesong became a "Directly Governed City" (Kaesŏng Chikhalsi; 개성 직할시; 開城 直轄市).

=== 21st century ===
In 2002, Kaesŏng Industrial Region was formed from part of Kaesong. In 2003, the remaining part of Kaesong (excluding the Industrial Region) became part of North Hwanghae Province. The city is close to the Demilitarized Zone that divides North and South Korea.

In October 2019, Kaesong became a "Special City".

== Geography ==
Located in the center of Korea, Kaesong is the southernmost city of North Korea. It is bordered by Kaepung, Changpung, Panmun, and Kumchon counties. Kanghwa Island of Incheon Municipality lies just south, beyond a narrow channel. It covers an area of 1,309 km^{2}, the urban district is surrounded by Songak (Songak-san; 송악산; 松嶽山) (489 m) and Pongmyong mountains. The city center surrounds the much smaller Mt. Janam (103 m), on which is located the city's Kim Il Sung statue.

In the northern part of Kaesong, the end of the Ahobiryŏng range creates the northernmost border of Kaesong City. This range consists of Mts. Chŏnma (757 m), Sŏnggŏ, Myoji (764 m), Suryong (716 m), Chesŏk (749 m), Hwajang (558 m), and Ogwan. With the exception of the mountainous northeastern region, however, most areas of Kaesong consist of low hills with heights less than 100 meters A.S.L.

The Imjin River flows along the northeastern border line of the city and the Ryesong River (禮成江) (Ryeseong-gang; 례성강) (transliterated in South Korea as Yeseong-gang; 예성강) runs along the western border to the mouth of the Han River. In addition to the two rivers, small and large rivers and streams such as the Samich'ŏn, Wŏlamch'ŏn, Chukbaech'ŏn, Kŭmsŏngch'ŏn, and Sach'ŏn rivers drain into the Han. The river basin located in the southwest of Kaesong has spacious alluvial plains such as P'ungdŏkbŏl, Singwangbŏl, and Samsŏngbŏl.

The geology consists of the Proterozoic, Cenozoic, and Paleozoic strata and Mesozoic intrusive granite. The underground resources include gold, zinc, copper, fluorspar, limestone, granite, and kaolin. The soil comprises generally brown forest soil while the areas drained by Yesŏng, Imjin, and Han rivers consist of mostly alluvial and saline soil. The climate is generally warm and moderate, with an average annual temperature of around 10 °C. The coldest month is January, with an average temperature of −5.9 °C, while the hottest month is August, with an average temperature of 24.7 °C. The average annual rainfall ranges from 1,300 to 1,400 millimeters. The duration of frost-free period is 180 days—the longest in North Korea. About 55% of Kaesong is forested (80% of the trees are pines), and 40 species of mammals and 250 birds inhabit the area.

=== Climate ===
Kaesong has a humid continental climate (Köppen climate classification: Dwa), with cold, dry winters and hot, humid summers with abundant rainfall.

Climate data for Kaesong (1991–2020)
| Month | Jan | Feb | Mar | Apr | May | Jun | Jul | Aug | Sep | Oct | Nov | Dec | Year |
|---|---|---|---|---|---|---|---|---|---|---|---|---|---|
| Mean daily maximum °C (°F) | 1.6 (34.9) | 4.6 (40.3) | 10.5 (50.9) | 17.3 (63.1) | 22.8 (73.0) | 26.8 (80.2) | 28.1 (82.6) | 29.3 (84.7) | 25.8 (78.4) | 20.1 (68.2) | 11.3 (52.3) | 3.6 (38.5) | 16.8 (62.2) |
| Daily mean °C (°F) | −3.6 (25.5) | −0.8 (30.6) | 4.6 (40.3) | 11.0 (51.8) | 16.7 (62.1) | 21.3 (70.3) | 24.1 (75.4) | 24.9 (76.8) | 20.4 (68.7) | 13.7 (56.7) | 5.9 (42.6) | −1.3 (29.7) | 11.4 (52.5) |
| Mean daily minimum °C (°F) | −8.1 (17.4) | −5.6 (21.9) | −0.3 (31.5) | 5.6 (42.1) | 11.6 (52.9) | 17.1 (62.8) | 21.1 (70.0) | 21.5 (70.7) | 15.9 (60.6) | 8.3 (46.9) | 1.1 (34.0) | −5.6 (21.9) | 6.9 (44.4) |
| Average precipitation mm (inches) | 10.9 (0.43) | 19.4 (0.76) | 24.7 (0.97) | 49.9 (1.96) | 95.2 (3.75) | 105.7 (4.16) | 359.9 (14.17) | 285.2 (11.23) | 109.9 (4.33) | 40.9 (1.61) | 40.8 (1.61) | 18.3 (0.72) | 1,160.8 (45.70) |
| Average precipitation days (≥ 0.1 mm) | 3.3 | 3.6 | 4.6 | 6.3 | 7.4 | 8.1 | 12.8 | 11.3 | 5.9 | 4.7 | 6.4 | 4.9 | 79.3 |
| Average snowy days | 4.6 | 3.1 | 1.6 | 0.1 | 0.0 | 0.0 | 0.0 | 0.0 | 0.0 | 0.0 | 1.4 | 4.9 | 15.7 |
| Average relative humidity (%) | 67.2 | 64.7 | 64.4 | 66.7 | 72.9 | 77.8 | 85.3 | 81.8 | 73.4 | 70.1 | 70.3 | 67.9 | 71.9 |
Source: Korea Meteorological Administration

== Administrative divisions ==
Before 2002, what is now Kaesong Directly Governed City was divided into one city (Kaesŏng itself) and one county and two wards: Changpung County, Kaepung-guyok and Panmun-guyok. In 2003, P'anmun-gun and part of Kaesong-si were separated from Kaesŏng Directly Governed City and merged to form Kaesong Industrial Region. The remaining part of Kaesŏng joined North Hwanghae Province in 2002. Kaesong is currently divided into 24 administrative districts known as Dong, as well as three villages ("ri"). After Kaesong promoted to Special City, Changpung County, Kaepung-guyok and Panmun-guyok return to Kaesong.

- Koryŏ-dong (고려동/高麗洞): Anhwasa temple is located here.
- Haeun-dong (해운동/海雲洞): Named after pavilion called Haeunru.
- Chanam-dong (자남동/子男洞): Named after Mount Chanam.
- Kwanhun-dong (관훈동/冠訓洞): The place was named as such due to the fact that the place had a 'Hunryonwon' (an institution that hired military officials and soldiers during the Joseon dynasty) and Gwaegwanhyon (also called, 'Gatgoljae', a place where Goryeo scholars protested by refusing to take the Gwageo and take off their gat hats).
- Manwŏl-tong (만월동/滿月洞): Named after Manwoldae.
- Naesŏng-dong (내성동/內城洞): Named after Naeseong of Kaesong city walls.
- Naman-dong (남안동/南安洞): Named as such because it was comfortably in the southern plains of Namdaemun (Kaesong).
- Nammun-dong (남문동/南門洞): Named after Namdaemun (Kaesong). The Bell of Yonbok Temple is located here.
- Namsan-dong (남산동/南山洞)
- Pangjik-tong (방직동/紡織洞)
- Posŏn-dong (보선동/保善洞)
- Pugan-dong (북안동/北安洞): Named as such because it was comfortably in the northern plains of Namdaemun (Kaesong). Kaesong Students' and Children's Palace is located here.
- Pusan-dong (부산동/扶山洞)
- Ryonghŭng-dong (룡흥동/龍興洞)
- Ryongsan-dong (룡산동/龍山洞)
- Songak-tong (송악동/松嶽洞)
- Sŏngnam-dong (성남동/城南洞)
- Sŏnjuk-tong (선죽동/善竹洞)
- Sŭngjŏn-dong (승전동/勝戰洞)
- Tonghŭng-dong (동흥동/東興洞)
- Tonghyŏn-dong (동현동/銅峴洞)
- Ŭndŏk-tong (은덕동/恩德洞)
- Unhak-tong (운학동/雲鶴洞)
- Yŏkchŏn-dong (역전동/驛前洞)
- Pagyŏn-ni (박연리/朴淵里)
- Samgŏ-ri (삼거리/三巨里)
- Tŏgam-ni (덕암리/德岩里)

== Culture ==
=== Landmarks ===
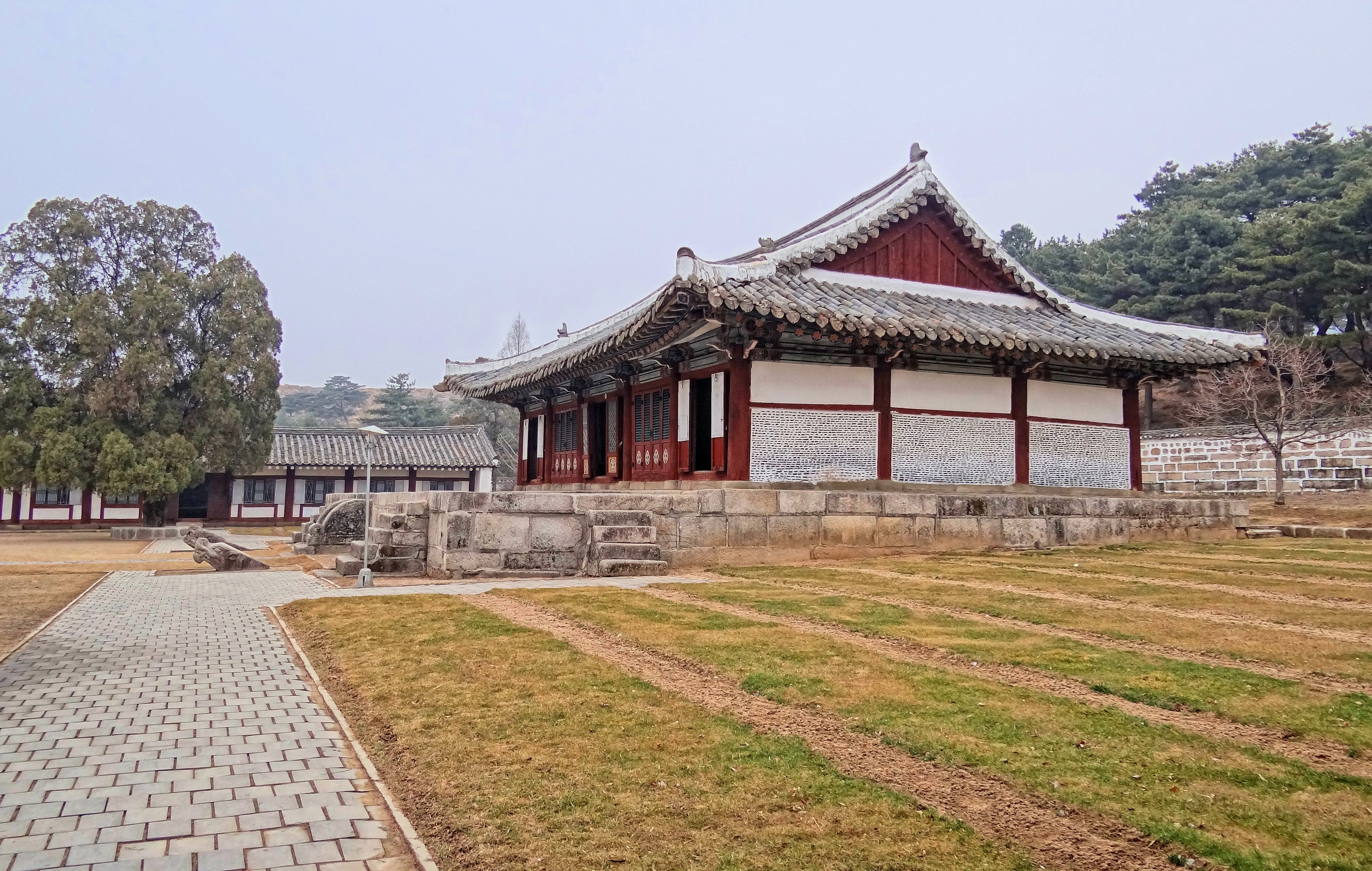
Goryeo Museum

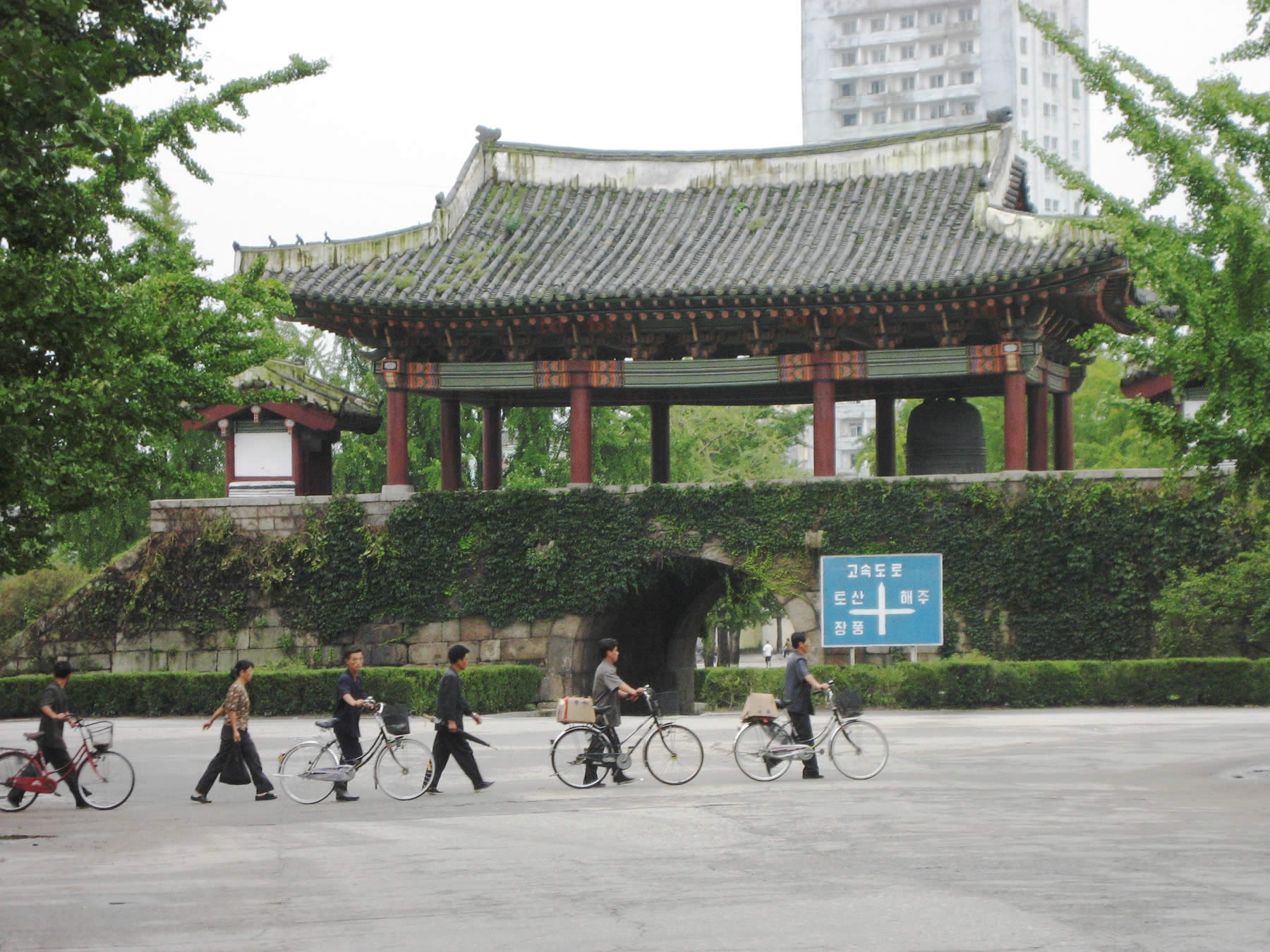
Namdaemun

Kaesong is home to the World Heritage Site Historic Monuments and Sites in Kaesong. Koryo Songgyungwan University (Light Industry), Communist University and Art College are located in Kaesong. The Koryo Museum, housed in the city's old Confucian academy, contains many priceless Goryeo arts and cultural relics (although many are copies, with the originals held in the vaults of the Korean Central History Museum in Pyongyang).

As the former capital of Goryeo, the tombs of almost all of the Goryeo kings are located in the area, though most are not accessible; the heavily reconstructed Tomb of King Wanggon, belonging to the dynasty's founder, Taejo of Goryeo, is located to the west of the city in Kaepung-gun. Other notable tombs include those of kings Hyejong of Goryeo (the Sollung Royal Tomb), Gyeongjong of Goryeo (Yongrung Royal Tomb), Seongjong of Goryeo (Kangrung Royal Tomb), Hyeonjong of Goryeo (Sollung Royal Tomb), Munjong of Goryeo (Kyongrung Royal Tomb), and Gongmin of Goryeo (Tomb of King Kongmin). Kaesong also contains North Korea's only two royal tombs dating to the Joseon: the Hurung Royal Tomb, belonging to the dynasty's second king, Jeongjong of Joseon, and the Cherung Royal Tomb, containing the remains of Queen Sinui, wife of the dynasty's founder, Yi Songgye (Taejo of Joseon). The two final tombs, despite belonging to members of the Joseon royal family, were excluded from the World Heritage Site Royal Tombs of the Joseon Dynasty because of their location in North Korea.

=== Cuisine ===
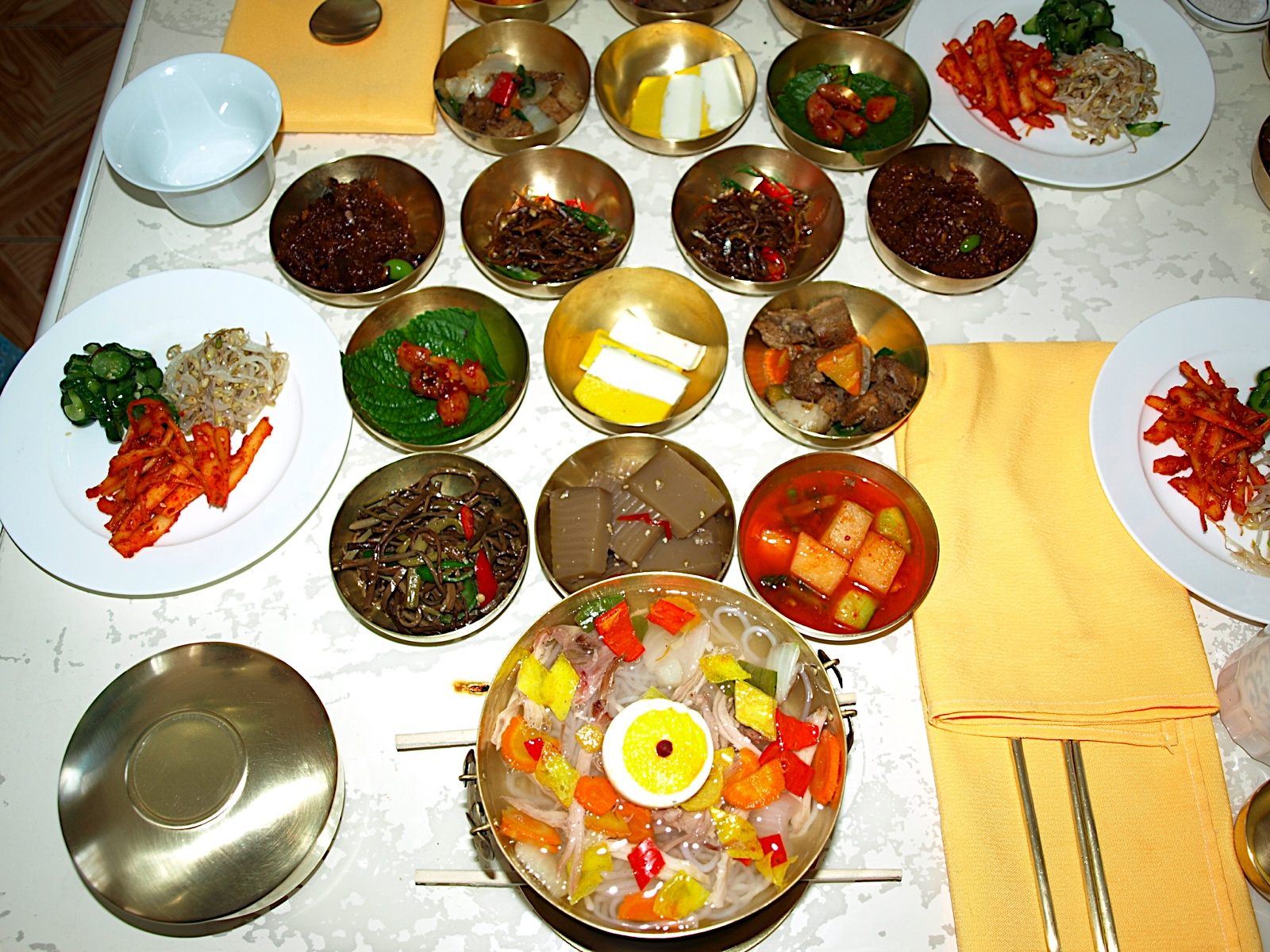
A meal for visitors at Tongil restaurant, Kaesong

Since Kaesong was the capital of Goryeo for 487 years, its culinary culture was highly developed. The luxurious style of Kaesong cuisine is frequently compared with Seoul cuisine and Jeolla cuisine. Kaesong cuisine was traditionally treated as part of Gyeonggi cuisine, since Kaesong belonged to Gyeonggi Province until 1950. However, it has been incorporated into the administration of North Korea after the Korean War while Gyeonggi Province is in South Korea. Bossam kimchi (wrapped kimchi), pyeonsu (square-shaped summer mandu), sinseollo (royal casserole), seolleongtang (ox bone soup), chueotang (mudfish soup), joraengi tteokguk (rice cake soup), umegi (tteok covered with syrup), and gyeongdan (ball-shaped tteok) are representative Kaesong dishes. Umegi, also called Kaesong juak, is a holiday food of Kaesong, and known for the delicate style with the sweet and nutty taste. The dish is made by kneading a mixture of rice flour and glutinous rice flour with warm water, by shaping the dough into balls with either one pine nut or jujube, by frying and coating them with syrup.

== Economy ==
With its topography, climate and soil, Kaesong has advantageous natural conditions for agricultural productions. The water supply system is established with 18 reservoirs, including Songdo Reservoir, built for agricultural advances and about 150 pumping stations as well as hundreds of dammed pools. The cultivated land accounts for 27% of Kaesong's area. Rice, maize, soybeans, wheat, and barley are the main crops. Among them, rice production accounts for 60% of the whole grain production, and Kaepung and Panmun are the two primary regions, producing more than 70% of the rice production. In addition, vegetable and fruit cultivation including peach, apple and persimmon, livestock farming, and sericulture are active. Peach is a local specialty of Kaesong, especially white peach, which accounts for more than 25% of the total fruit production. The counties of Kaepung-gun and Panmun-gun are also known for cultivating the quality Korean ginseng called Goryeo Insam.

Kaesong is North Korea's light industry centre. The urban district is equipped with a jewel processing factory, ginseng processing factory and an embroidery factory. Since the Goryeo period, Kaesong had been a center of handcrafts such as Goryeo ware and commerce while the textile industry has been the primary business along with the production of grocery goods, daily general goods, and ginseng products after the division into the two states. The food processing industry ranks next to the textile business, mainly producing jang (soybean-based condiments), oil, canned foods, alcoholic beverages, soft drinks and others. In addition, resin, timber, handicrafts, pottery, shoes, school supplies, musical instruments, and glass are produced. Kaesong has factories for producing agricultural machines and tractor repair.

As of 2002, the city contained the headquarters of the Central Bank of North Korea, with branches also in Kapung and Panmun counties.

North Korea and South Korea jointly operate an industrial complex in the Kaesong Industrial Region. The industrial park, built around 2005, employs over 53,400 North Koreans at over 120 South Korean textile and other labor-intensive factories. In early 2013, approximately 887 South Koreans worked in the complex, which produced an estimated $470 million of goods in 2012, and the complex employed a sixth of Kaesong's working people.

Amid tensions in 2013, the industrial park was temporarily closed. It was closed again in 2016.

=== Tourism ===
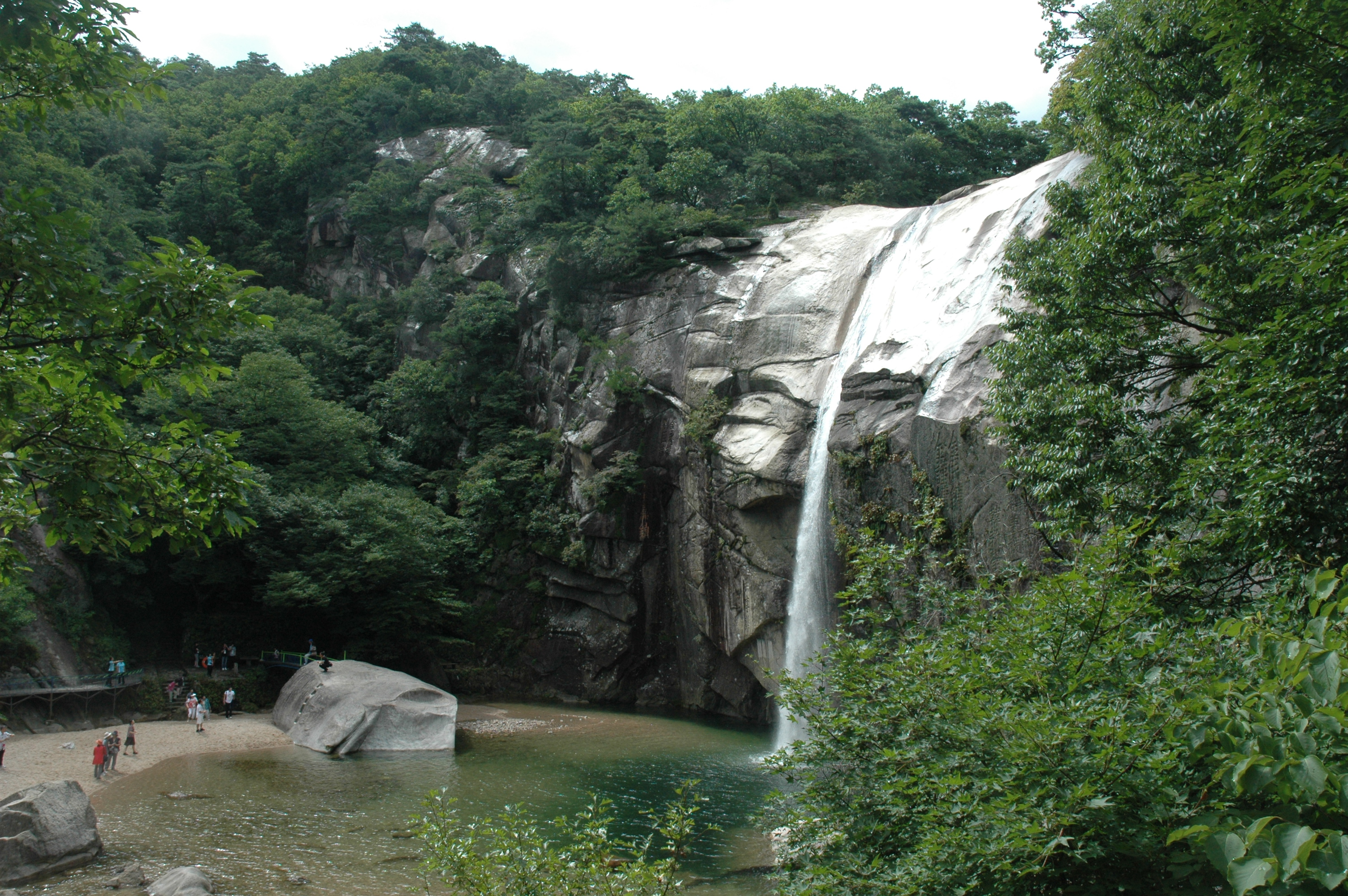
Pakyon Falls

Kaesong is a major destination for foreign visitors to North Korea. Many Goryeo-era sites are located in Kaesong, including the Kaesong Namdaemun gate, the Songgyungwan Confucian Academy, now the Koryo Museum, and the Sonjuk Bridge and Pyochung Pavilion. Less-known sites include Kwandok Pavilion, the ruined Goryeo-era Manwoldae Palace, Anhwa Temple, Sungyang Hall, Mokchong Hall(목청전), and the Kaesong Chomsongdae (개성 첨성대; 開城 瞻星臺) observatory. Located to the west of the city are the tombs of Kings Kongmin and Wanggon; twenty-four km north of Kaesong is Taehungsan Fortress, a Koguryo satellite fortress built to protect Pyongyang. This castle contains the Kwanum and Taehung Temples. The famous Pakyon Falls are located in the area, as well as a large, recently discovered Goryeo-era Buddha carved into the stone on Mt. Chonma. Most tourists to Kaesong are put in the traditional Kaesong Folk Hotel, housed in 19 traditional hanok courtyard houses.

== Education ==
Kim Il-sung and Kim Jong-il mural in Kaesong city

Sungkyunkwan, one kilometer north of Seonjukgyo bridge is a representative traditional educational institution in Kaesong. It was founded in the neighborhood of Gukja-dong with the name Gukjagam (국자감; 國子監) in 992 during the reign of King Seongjong of Goryeo, which ignited Korean Confucianism. Its name was changed to Gukhak (국학; 國學) in the reign of Chungnyeol of Goryeo and was referred to as Seonggyungwan. In 1367, the 16th year of Gongmin of Goryeo's reign, the structure was revamped and Yi Saek, and Chŏng Mong-ju, Confucian scholars of the time taught there as professors. In 1592, the 25th year of Seonjo of Joseon's reign, Kim Yuk reconstructed the institution which was burned down by the Japanese during the Japanese invasions of Korea (1592–1598).

The first modern school that appeared in Kaesong was Hanyeong Seowon (한영서원; 韓英書院), or Anglo-Korean School established by Yun Chi-ho in 1906, with the help of American missionaries Mr. Wasson, and Mr. Candler. It obtained authorization as Songdo High School from Governor-General of Korea in 1917, and expanded to the Songdo School Foundation in 1950 with the accreditation for the establishment of Songdo Middle School and Songdo College of Pharmacy, the latter of which produced 40 graduates. However, when the Korean War occurred, the foundation was moved to Incheon, and reconstructed Songdo Middle and High Schools in 1953 which still exist to the present.

By 1950, there were two public high schools: Kaeseong High School (개성중학교; 開城中學校) and Kaeseong Girls' High School (개성고등여학교; 開城高等女學校) and three private high schools: Songdo High School (송도중학교; 松都中學校), Jeonghwa Girls' School (정화여학교;貞和女學校) and Hosudon Girls' School (호수돈여학교; 好壽敦女學校). Like Songdo High School, Jeonghwa and Hosudon Girls' Schools, with the teachers and most students, evacuated south during the Korean War and their campuses now are located in Seoul and Daejeon respectively.

There were also eight public elementary schools (국민학교) in Kaeseong by 1950, they were the Manwol (만월; 滿月), Donghyun (동현; 銅峴), Seonjuk (선죽; 善竹), Koryo (고려; 高麗), Songdo (송도; 松都), Junggyeong (중경; 中京), Namsan (남산; 南山) and Deokam (덕암; 德岩) elementary schools.

As of 2002, Kaesong had 80 each public elementary schools which scattered in each unit of ri (village), 60 middle-high schools, 3 colleges and 3 universities such as Songdo University of Politics, Kaesong University of Education, and Kaesong Communist University.

== Transportation ==
Kaesong is connected to Pyongyang and other cities by rail and highways. The city's main railway station is Kaesong Station, which is on the Pyongbu Line.

There was a plan to build a trolleybus line in this city, but it never came to fruition.

== Sister cities ==
- (Peru) Cusco (1990)

== People born in Kaesong ==
=== Goryeo ===
- Uicheon (1055–1191), founder of the Cheontae Buddhist sect
- Ch'oe Ch'ung-hŏn (1149–1219), a military ruler of Korea during the Goryeo
- Ch'oe U (died 1249), general of the Goryeo, son of Ch'oe Ch'ung-hŏn

=== Joseon ===
- Sŏ Kyŏngdŏk
- Hwang Hui (1363–1452), prime minister of Joseon
- Hwang Jin-i (1515–1550), famous Kisaeng and poet
- Han Sŏkpong

=== Overseas Koreans ===
- Lee Jong soo (Chong Lee) (1938–2017), Father of Taekwondo in Canada
- K. W. Lee (1928–2025), Korean-American print journalist
- Young-Il Ahn

=== South Korea ===
- Won Pyong Oh (1926–2020), South Korean zoologist
- Chin Byung Ho (1909–1972), Dean of Seoul National University Medical School
- Park Wan-suh (1931–2011), South Korean writer
- Youn Yuh-jung (1947–), South Korean actress and Academy Award winner
- Kim Seong-hwan, South Korean cartoonist
- Yang Ju-dong, South Korean academic, poet
- O Yeong-su, actor
- Han Youngsoo, South Korean photographer

=== North Korea ===
- Kim Hyon-hui, North Korean agent and mass murderer
- Woo In-hee (died 1981), North Korean actress and a mistress of Kim Jong Il.
- Oh Chong-song, former North Korean soldier and defector
- Choe Chol-su, North Korean boxer

== Notes ==
| Preceded by | Capital of Korea; 919–1394 | Succeeded by Hanseong |
