= Namdaemun (disambiguation) =

Namdaemun (Korean for "South Grand Gate") is a historic gate in Seoul, South Korea, officially known as Sungnyemun.

Namdaemun may also refer to:

== Gates ==
- Namdaemun (Kaesong), a historic gate in Kaesong, North Korea

== Other ==
- Namdaemun Market, one of the oldest and largest traditional outdoor markets in South Korea, which is located very near the Namdaemun Gate
- Namdaemun Market station, an alternate name for Hoehyeon station, a subway station near Namdaemun Market in Seoul, South Korea
- Namdaemun Station, the first Seoul railway station
- Namdaemunno, a major thoroughfare in central Seoul, South Korea
