= Manwŏltae =

Goryeo-era palace in Kaesong, North Korea

UNESCO World Heritage Site
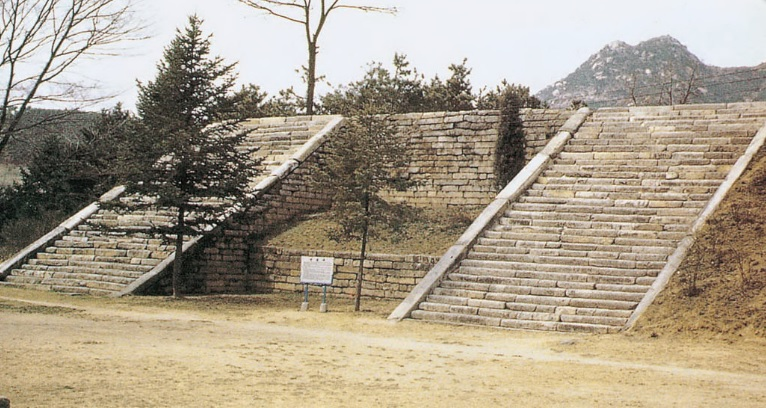
- Manwoldae & Kaesong Chomsongdae

- Location within North Korea
- Location: Kaesong in North Korea
- Part of: Historic Monuments and Sites in Kaesong
- Criteria: (ii), (iii)
- Reference: 1278
- Inscription: 2013 (37th Session)
- Area: 43.5 ha (107 acres)
- Buffer zone: 5,222.1 ha (12,904 acres)
- Coordinates: 37°59′06″N 126°32′36″E

- Manwŏltae
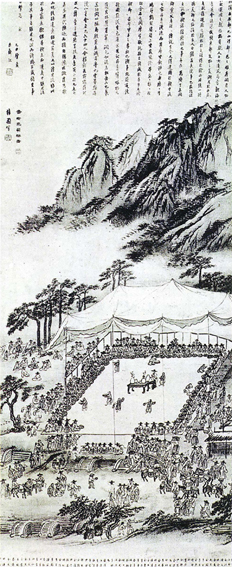
- Kim Hong-do painting, Kyehoe on Site of Manwŏltae

Korean name
- Hangul: 만월대
- Hanja: 滿月臺
- RR: Manwoldae
- MR: Manwŏltae

Manwŏltae (Korean: 만월대; Hanja: 滿月臺; lit. 'Full Moon Platform'), or Mangwŏltae (망월대; 望月臺), was the main palace of the Goryeo Dynasty of Korea. It did not have an official name, such as "Gyeongbokgung" (the main palace of the Joseon Dynasty), because it was an imperial palace like the imperial palaces of China (e.g. "大內", "皇城"). Located in the Goryeo capital of Kaesong (now in North Korea), the palace was burned in 1011, 1126, 1171, 1225, and 1362. The name "Manwŏltae" was given to the ruins of the palace during the 14th or 15th century of the Joseon period.

== History ==
Construction on the palace began in 919, at the beginning of the Goryeo Dynasty; it was built south of the Songak Mountains for good Feng Shui. The palace was divided into two major sections; the Kungsŏng (궁성, 宮城), where the king and royal family resided, and the Hwangsŏng (황성, 皇城), where affairs of state were conducted. Large buildings such as the Changhwa (장화전, 長和殿), and Wŏndŏk (원덕전, 元德殿) Halls contained shrines and living quarters, while Hoegyŏng Hall (회경전, 會慶殿), the largest and most impressive, contained the throne room. The complex also contained a stone astronomy tower known as the Chŏmsŏngdae (첨성대, 瞻星臺), which was used by royal astrologers. The palace was burned to the ground in 1361 when the Red Turbans invaded and sacked the city of Kaesong, forcing the king to temporarily flee Andong. Contemporary records describe the palace to as containing buildings of immense proportions similar to the building sizes found in the Forbidden City. The architectural style and decoration is said to have followed the uniquely Korean royal color palette called Dancheong, which is seen in other Korean palaces that still stand today. However, Mandoldae Palace is described to have contained many multistory buildings, more gold embellishments, and blue and white colours, as compared to the surviving palaces from Korea's more recent Confucian Joseon Dynasty, which stressed humility and restrain in all things. Therefore, Manwŏltae gives us valuable insight into another distinct form of Korean palace architecture that had been forgotten due to foreign invasions. During the Sunjong's travel of Kaesung, he visited the palace on 31 January 1909.

== Description ==
The palace is thought to have had blue celadon roof tiles, similar to other excavated tiles dating from the same period.

== Excavations and findings ==
Excavation of the ruins of Manwŏltae Palace began under the supervision of the North Korean government, but merged into a joint Korean cultural project. Many valuable relics of the late Goryeo period have been uncovered at the site, including ceramics, metal items, ancestral tablets, mirrors, and over 3,000 roofing tiles. It is on a list of locations planned by North Korea to become UNESCO World Heritage Sites. As of 2015, both Koreas have conducted six rounds of joint excavations of the site since 2007; the 2015 round of excavations will last 6 months, the longest excavation period to date.

A 25 cm celadon jar with an inlaid monkey and tree design in an underglaze of gold found at the site is held at the National Museum of Korea.

Excavation at the site uncovered a "unique" two-feet vase-like cylinder made from celadon. The object’s function was still unclear as of June 2015. The vase-like object bears an intricate pattern of peonies and vines and used to have holes at the top and bottom; it was speculated to have been a flower pot or a vessel used for some ceremonial purpose. A modern South Korean celadon maker explains "the piece is unique because of its size. Due to the nature of the celadon ceramics, an object of this size would be very difficult to bake properly, even more difficult than smaller items that often emerge broken or bent from the furnace."

In November 2015, the excavation had unearthed a piece of metal type, with initial reports dating it from Goryeo Dynasty, but it requires further study to verify when it was made. Researchers hope to radiocarbon date the object. They are to study when it was made, what kind of font was used, and what it is made of. There are traces of ink on the type.

== See also ==
- National Treasures of North Korea
- Anhak Palace
- Gyeongbokgung
