= Bell of Yonbok Temple =

Historic bell in North Korea

- Hangul: 연복사종
- Hanja: 演福寺鐘
- RR: Yeonboksa jong
- MR: Yŏnboksa chong

The Bell of Yonbok Temple (Korean: 연복사종; Hanja: 演福寺鐘) is an historic bell which is kept on the upper storey of the Namdae Gate in Kaesong, North Korea. It is listed as number 136 on the list of National Treasures of North Korea and is one of the "three famous bells in the DPRK along with the bells in Sangwon and Pongdok Temples".

== Description ==
The bell is 3.3 metres (11 ft) high, 23 centimetres (9.1 in) thick, has a diameter of 1.9 metres (6.2 ft) at its mouth, and weighs about 14 tons. The bell is covered with figures of tortoises, crabs, dragon, phoenix, deer and a representation of the Buddha. Two dragons on the top of the bell represent the "intrepid spirit". Made in 1346, the bell was moved to the Namdae Gate in 1563 when the Temple burnt down. The decorations on the bell are described by the KCNA as "refined, elegant and solemn" and the bell "shows the then high standard of metal casting and metal craft technique of the Korean nation". A series of lines are engraved along the middle of the bell, dividing the upper from the lower part. The bell-hook is fashioned to show two tangled dragons, "wriggling as if they were alive". The bell has an inscription in six scripts, including Chinese, Sanskrit, Mongolian and Tibetan. The lettering invokes peace between Koryo and the Yuan Chinese state. Scholars debate whether the bell was cast by Chinese bellsmiths or if it was forcibly made by Korean craftsmen under pressure from the Mongol invaders as an effort to enforce their subjugation of the Korean state.

When rung, the bell can be heard 4 kilometres (2.5 miles) away. The bell was rung to mark the hour for the people of Kaesong until early in the 1900s.

The bell was believed to be one of the oldest in the country, dating back to the Koryo period, until one was found in 2002 that was almost 150 years older than it.
