= Young-Il Ahn =

Korean American artist (1934–2020)

Young-Il Ahn (1934, Gaeseong, Korea-12 December 2020) was a Korean American artist living and working in Los Angeles, California. Considered a child prodigy in his native Korea, Young-Il Ahn relocated permanently to the United States in 1966. His painting style is mostly abstract, and tends to be inspired by his natural surroundings. In recent years, his work has been exhibited in retrospectives at LACMA and Long Beach Museum of Art.

== Personal life and water series ==
Young-Il Ahn was born in 1934, in Gaeseong, Korea, and earned his BFA from Seoul National University in 1958. In 1983, Young-Il Ahn was temporarily lost at sea in dense fog while on a fishing boat off the coast of Santa Monica. The experience of seeing how the water looked when the fog lifted led him to develop his Water Series, a group of paintings he has been developing for more than 30 years based on trying to capture the sensation of light and shadow reflecting on the surface of the water. The Water series has been the subject of multiple articles and museum exhibitions examining Young-Il Ahn's work. The estate of Young-Il Ahn is represented by Harper's in New York.

== Connection to Dansaekhwa ==
In 2015, author Yoon Jin Sup, an authority on the 20th-century Korean art movement Dansaekhwa curated Young-Il Ahn into the exhibition Dansaekhwa II: The Traces of Four Artists at the LA Art Show. In his writing for the exhibition, Yoon stated, "Young-Il Ahn’s canvases are comprised of small, repeating square-shaped dabs of color. This repetitive feature of his work comes from the same artistic tradition of the first-generation Korean Dansaekhwa painters, including Kim Whan-ki (1913–1974), Park Seo-bo (born 1931), Lee Ufan (born 1936), Chung Sanghwa (born 1932), and Ha Chong-hyun (born 1935)."

Dansaekhwa originated in Korea in the 1970s. As a Korean born artist working in America since 1966, Young-Il Ahn developed his methods independently of Korean-based artists, and is considered unique amongst Dansaekhwa artists.

== Bibliography ==
- 2018 Young-Il Ahn (exhibition catalogue)
- 2017 Unexpected Light: Works by Young-Il Ahn (exhibition catalogue)
- 2017 And Still it Flows Towards Me: A Life Lived with Art (memoir)
