= Mausoleum of King Wang Kŏn =

King's tomb in North Korea

Coordinates: 37°59′5″N 126°30′20″E

- Tomb of King Taejo of Goryeo
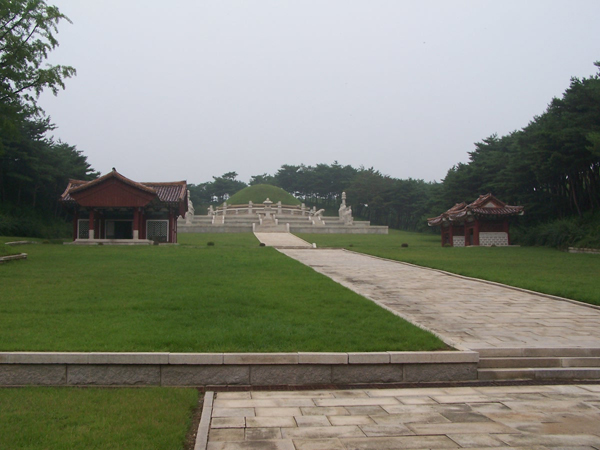

Korean name
- Chosŏn'gŭl: 왕건왕릉
- Hancha: 王建王陵
- Revised Romanization: Wanggeonwangneung
- McCune–Reischauer: Wanggŏnwangnŭng

Hyeolleung
- Chosŏn'gŭl: 현릉
- Hancha: 顯陵
- Revised Romanization: Hyeolleung
- McCune–Reischauer: Hyŏllŭng

The Mausoleum of King Wang Kŏn (Korean: 왕건왕릉), more correctly known as the Hyŏllŭng Royal Tomb, is a mausoleum located Haesong Village, Kaesŏng, North Korea. The tomb belongs to the founder of the Goryeo Dynasty, Wang Kon, who received the temple name 'Taejo' and was the first monarch to unify the entire Korean peninsula after the subjugation the southern states of Silla and Baekje. Construction on the tomb began after the King's death in 943. Nonetheless, by the end of the occupation period there was little left of the original tomb, which had deteriorated due to abandonment and looting by Japanese forces. The tomb was heavily reconstructed in 1994, and all of the original buildings and statues were cleared away in order to accomplish its "restoration". The site is nominated for World Heritage status.

== See also ==
- Tomb of King Gongmin
- Tomb of King Tongmyong
- National Treasure (North Korea)
