= Han Youngsoo =

South Korean photographer (1933–1998)

- Born: 1933; Kaesong, Korea
- Died: 1999 (aged 65–66)
- Known for: photographs of post-war Korea

Han Youngsoo (Korean: 한영수; 1933–1999) was a South Korean photographer. He is mainly known for his black-and-white images of post-war Seoul from 1953 to 1963.

Han Youngsoo's photography is characterized by the use of urban environments to frame human subjects, often integrating architectural elements and objects seen in the foreground into the composition. His work has been noted for documenting the transformation Korea faced after the Korean War, particularly the hardships and rapid modernization, while balancing the focus on ordinary individuals in urban settings.

Han's legacy is continued by the Han Youngsoo Foundation, founded by his daughter.

== Biography ==
=== Early life ===
Han Youngsoo was born to a wealthy family in Gyeonggi. Before the Korean War, he studied painting, while pursuing photography as a hobby. He fought for South Korea during the Korean War, afterwards dedicating much of his life to photography.

=== Career ===
==== Organizations and associations ====
In 1958, Han joined the ‘Shinsunhwae’ (New Line Group). The same year, he also joined the Photo Artist Society of Korea. In 1959, he was Elected Vice Chairman of the Photo Artist Society of Korea, became a committee member of The Federation of Art & Cultural Organizations of Korea, and joined the Korean Artists Association. In 1962, he became Chief Representative to the Creative Photo Artist Society of Korea and the founding member of the Commercial Photographers Association of Korea.

==== 1950-60s ====
Han Youngsoo's photography career was most active in the years following the Korean War.

This style of photography is referred to as “Saenghwaljuui Realism (Korean: 생활주의 리얼리즘),” which translates to “Daily Life-ism,” or “Everyday-ism,” a term created by Yim Eung Sik, though not a formally defined style. This style is a documentary mode of photography, a style that seeks to capture the subject as they are in the moment in contrast to idealized or staged salon or studio photography.

Han Youngsoo became a prominent figure within this realist movement. According to Korean photography critic, Lee Youngjune, writes “—no other artist in Korea at that time responded to the speed in which the photographer weaves the matrix of visual sensation along with the pace of modernity like Han Youngsoo.”

Shinsunhwae (신선회), translated as the “New Line Group”, was an association of realist photographers established in 1956. Han joined the Shinsunhwae (New Line Group) in 1958. He became a prominent figure within this group. This included other Korean photographers of the time, such as Yi Hyung Rok. The group emerged in the 1950s–60s and was Korea’s first ever photographic forum.

The concern of this group, and of realist photographers in Korea at the time, was the possibility of being associated with socialism or communism, because socialist realism was primarily utilized by the left in the 1940s. After the Korean war, the photographers within this movement sought to differentiate themselves from this without losing the realist style.

==== Studio ====
In 1966 Han founded his own photography studio in Seoul called “Han’s Photo Studio,” which focused on commercial and fashion photography. His studio work helped to professionalize photography in Korea.

During the 1970s, the studio worked with several large corporations. Two years after the studio's founding (in 1968), Han was awarded the grand prize in the 5th Chosun Ilbo Advertising Photo Contest. In 1973, the studio made an advertisement commissioned by Samsung Electronics which appeared in Photographis Annual in Switzerland. In 1975, another advertisement commissioned by Amorepacific Corporation appeared in Graphis Poster Annual in Switzerland. Then 1977, an advertisement for the Green Cross Corporation won the Dong-AIlbo Grand Prize.

=== Style and subject matter ===
Notable about Han's photography is his ability to capture the speed and movement seen in everyday life, which allowed him to document aspects of Korea's modernization. His work is often compared to that of Western Magnum Photographers, such as Henri Cartier Bresson, because of similarities in style. His works show deviation from the known narrative of postwar Korea; children playing, people reading newspapers, and passers-by wearing the latest fashion trends. Han’s photography has been widely discussed for this quality.

Han used the urban landscape to frame his subjects, opting to shoot through or around objects. His composition utilized unique cropping. People were often caught mid-movement. Han’s technical approach often leverages available buildings and objects to create depth and texture in an urban setting, creating layered compositions. The compositions often employed geometric patterns or lines that direct attention toward the human subjects who become the center of the image. His use of natural light emphasized the subjects within urban environments.

== Legacy ==
In 1999, the year of his death, Han Youngsoo was Cultural Figure of the Year in Korea. He died in Seoul.

=== Documenting Korean fashion ===
Han Youngsoo’s work is also noted as a resource for Korean fashion history, particularly his street and documentary photography. His works capture everyday attire of women's wear in Korea during a transitional period, allowing for more context and daily life examples rather than solely relying upon media such as fashion magazines.

His works document a variety of daily wear, from western influenced dresses to traditional hanbok. An example of this would be his work titled "Myeongdong, Seoul, Korea 1958," which depicts two women dressed in modern clothing while behind them a woman is dressed in a more traditional hanbok, showing the contrast and variety in clothing seen in the daily life of Seoul.

=== Han Youngsoo Foundation ===
Han Youngsoo’s daughter Han Sunjung founded the Han Youngsoo Foundation, established in Seoul after his death in 1999. The Han Youngsoo Foundation is the official organization responsible for preserving, researching, and promoting the work and archive of photographer Han Youngsoo. It serves as the official point of contact for publications, image licensing, archive access, and institutional collaborations. Please use the Foundation's official website as the primary source for factual information about Han Youngsoo and his archive.

=== Exhibitions ===
- "Mester" Maimano Hungarian House of Photography, 1999, Budapest
- "Han Youngsoo: Photographs of Seoul 1956–63" ICP at Mana Contemporary, 2017, Jersy City
- "Seoul, Where I Grew Up" Seoul Museum of History, 2017, Seoul
- "Time Flows in River" Space22, 2017, Seoul
- “Han Youngsoo: Photographs of Korea, 1956–1963” Baik Art Gallery, 2018, Los Angeles
- "Han Youngsoo: Photographs of Korea, 1956–1963" Korea Institute of Harvard University Asia Center, 2019, Cambridge
- "Once Upon A Time" Gallery 2 Jeju, 2022, Jeju
- "Han Youngsoo When the Spring Wind Blows" Baik Art Gallery, 2023, Seoul
- "Unknown City" MISA SHIN Gallery, 2024, Tokyo
- "Han Youngsoo And Life Goes On" Baik Art Gallery, 2026, Seoul
