= Koryo Songgyungwan University =

Educational institution in North Korean city of Kaesong

Coordinates: 37°58′52″N 126°33′58″E

Koryo Songgyoongwan University
- 고려성균관
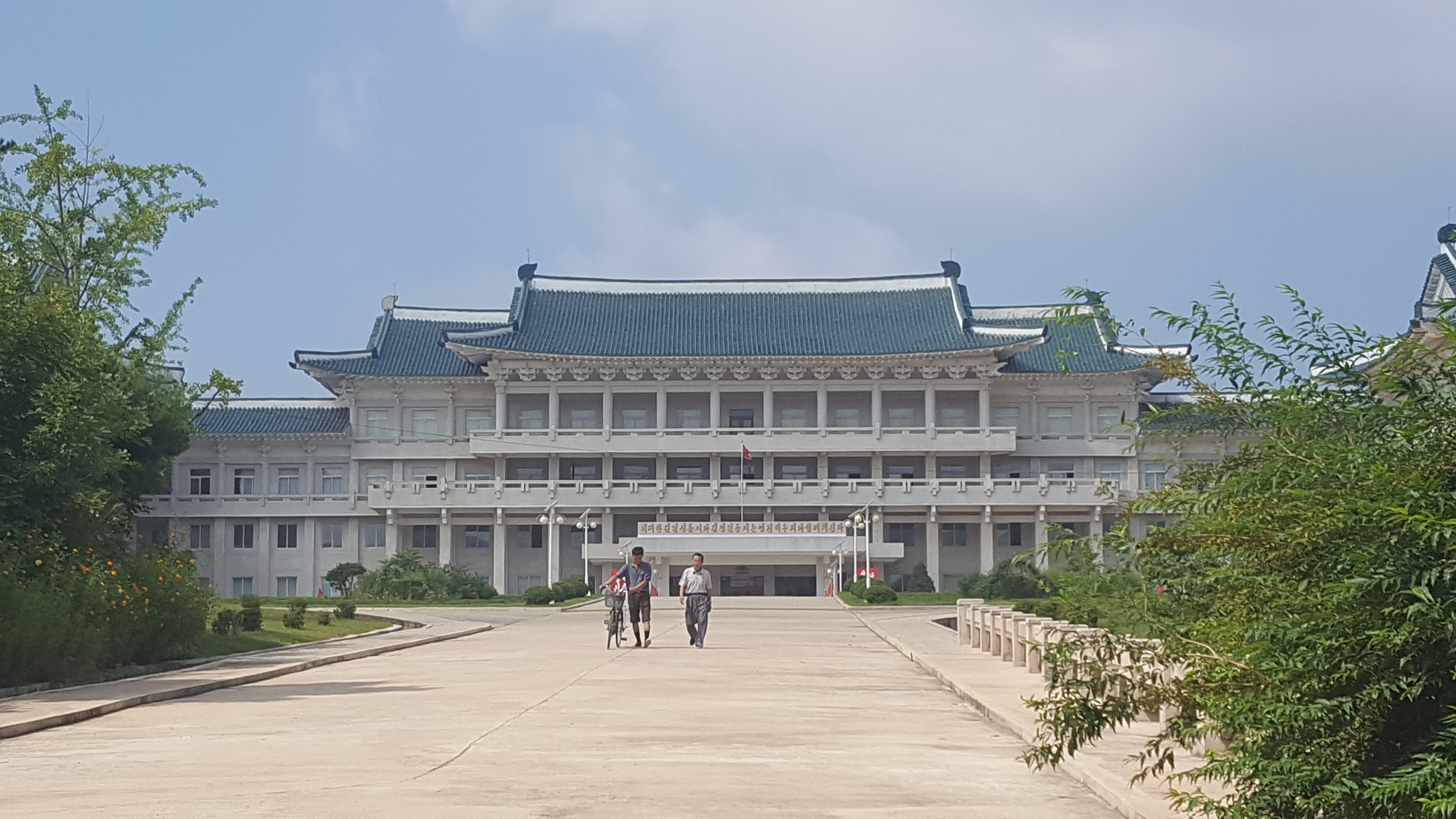
- Former names: Kukchagam, and Songgyungam
- Established: 992; 1034 years ago
- Location: Kaesong, North Korea
- Colors: Blue, and Yellow

- Koryo Songgyungwan University
- Hangul: 고려성균관
- Hanja: 高麗成均館
- RR: Goryeo Seonggyungwan
- MR: Koryŏ Sŏnggyun'gwan

Koryo Songgyungwan University (Korean: 고려성균관) or University of Light Industry is an educational institution in North Korean city of Kaesong. The university was founded in 992 with the name Kukchagam. It was renamed Songgyungam in 1298 and Songgyungwan in 1308.

It is one of the oldest universities in North Korea.

== See also ==
- List of universities in North Korea
