= Anhwasa =

Buddhist temple in Kaesong, North Korea

Coordinates: 38.0022°N 126.5500°E

- Hangul: 안화사
- Hanja: 安和寺
- RR: Anhwasa
- MR: Anhwasa

Anhwasa is a Korean Buddhist temple located on Mt. Songak in the historic city of Kaesong, North Korea. Once one of the smallest of the many temples in Kaesong, today it is the only one to have survived the Korean War.

== History ==
Anhwa Temple was founded under the Koryo dynasty in 930 AD, originally named as Anhwa Seon-Won (安和禪院). The temple was founded to mourn Wang Shin (王信), who was the younger brother of Taejo of Goryeo sent to Later Baekje and was later killed by Chin Hwŏn for the death of his son Chin Ho (眞虎). In 1117 AD, the temple became a large temple of national importance. The pyeonaek (English: "framed title", 편액,扁額) of the building was written by Emperor Huizong of Song due to a request made by Yejong of Goryeo and was sent to Goryeo along with buddha statues and treasures. Its location, on the south face of Mt. Songak, was specifically chosen for its good feng shui. During the Yi dynasty, the government funded several restorations of the buildings. The temple suffered some damage from US bombings during the Korean War, including the destruction of Myongbu Hall (冥府殿). Today, there remains Taeung Hall (大雄殿), the temple's main shrine; Obaek Hall (五百殿, "Hall of Five Hundred") filled with innumerable small Buddhist statues; and the monks' living quarters and kitchen. There is also a stone pagoda dating to the original Koryo-era temple. The temple was restored in 1989.
