= Kim Young-gyu =

Kim Young-gyu (Korean: 김영규) or Kim Young-kyu is a Korean name consisting of the family name Kim and the given name Young-gyu, and may also refer to:

- Kim Young-kyu (field hockey) (born 1969), South Korean field hockey player
- Kim Young-gyu (footballer) (born 1995), South Korean footballer
- Kim Young-kyu (baseball) (born 2000), South Korean baseball player
