= Sonjuk Bridge =

Bridge in North Korea

Coordinates: 37°58′54″N 126°30′29″E

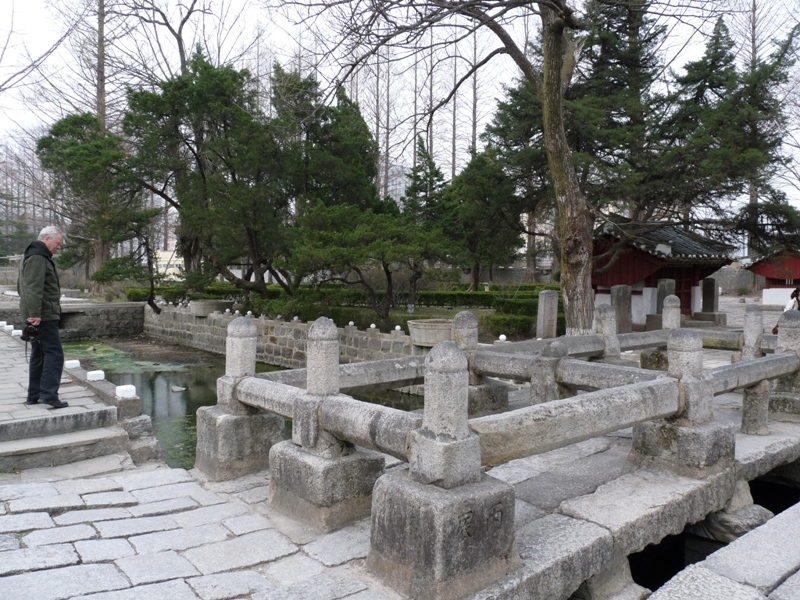
- Sonjuk bridge in 2012 in Kaesong, North Korea

Korean name
- Hangul: 선죽교
- Hanja: 善竹橋
- RR: Seonjukgyo
- MR: Sŏnjukkyo

Sŏnjuk Bridge is a Koryo-dynasty stone bridge located in Kaesong, North Korea. Built in 1290, it is famous as the place where famed Confucian scholar and statesman Chŏng Mong-ju was assassinated, allegedly on the orders of the Yi Pang-wŏn, son of the first king of the Joseon Dynasty, Yi Sŏng-gye. It is also the bridge on which the forces of Yi Bang-won (later King Taejong) confronted the forces of Yi Bang-gan during the Second Princes' Rebellion.

The bridge was closed to all traffic in 1780 and has since been a national monument.

It is 8.35m long and 3.36m wide. It was originally named the Sonji Bridge, but was renamed Sonjuk Bridge after the assassination of Chŏng Mong-ju because bamboo grew where he was killed (juk being the Korean word for bamboo).

== Assassination of Chŏng Mong-ju ==
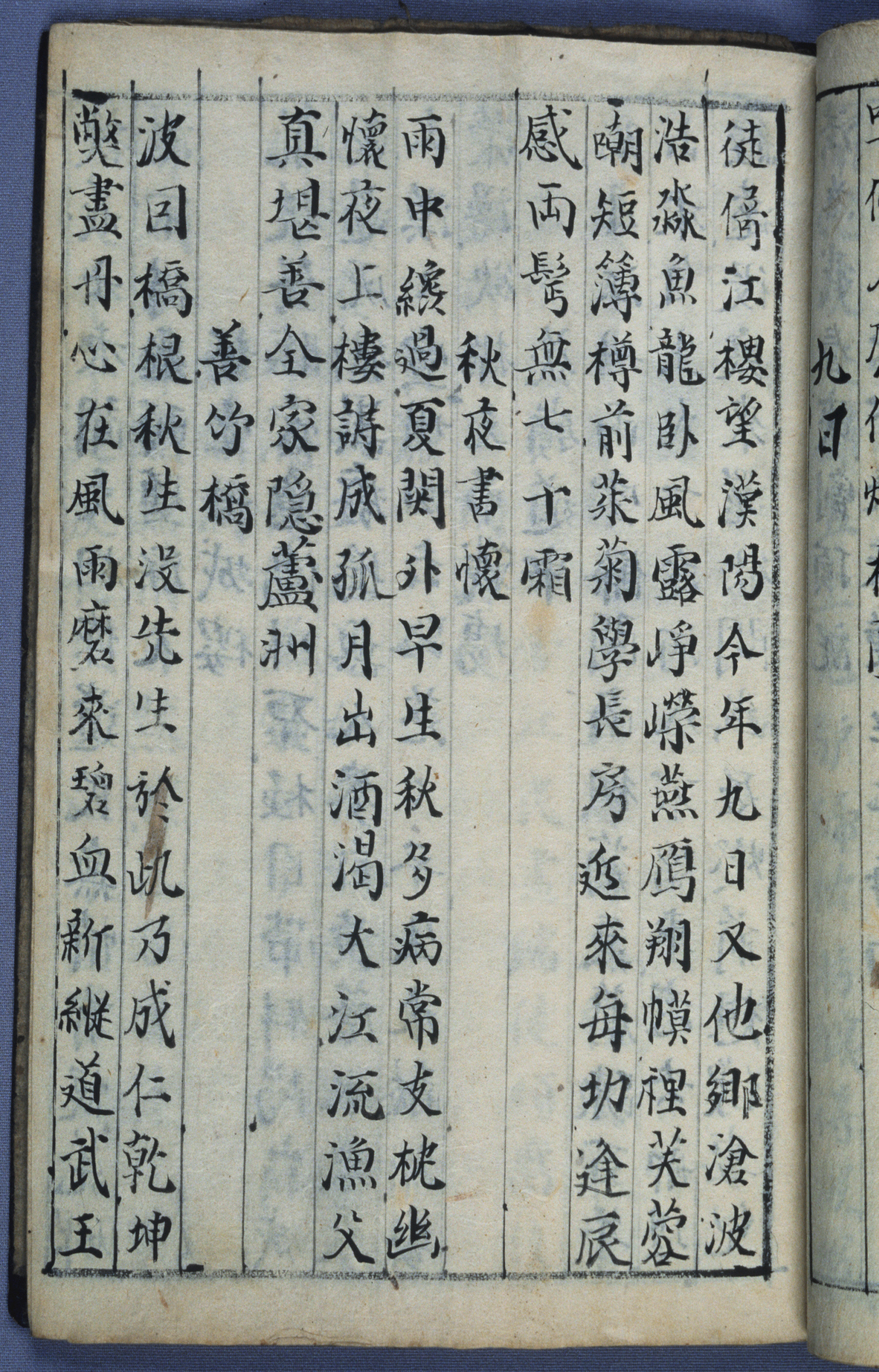
poem (1939) concerning the death of Chŏng on the bridge

A famously loyal advisor to the king of Goryeo, Chŏng was a staunch political opponent of Yi Sŏng-gye. On his way home after a party held for him by the future king, he was ambushed by five men on the bridge and brutally murdered with an iron hammer. Later canonized as a Korean sage, and revered even by Joseon monarchs, Chŏng's death came to symbolize unwavering loyalty. A brown spot on one of the stones is said to be Chŏng's bloodstain, and to become red when it rains. A famous poem of his ("known as "Song of a Loyal Heart") records his thoughts:

Even if I may die, die a hundred times,
Even if my skeleton may become dust and dirt,
And whether my spirit may be there or not,
My single-hearted loyalty to my lord will not change.

=== Pyochung Pavilion ===
Built during the Joseon dynasty, this small wooden structure houses two enormous stone stele mounted on the backs of lion-turtles, one erected in 1740 by King Yeongjo and the other by King Gojong in 1872. Both commemorate Chŏng Mong-ju's assassination, and praise his loyalty to the Goryeo dynasty.

== See also ==
- National Treasures of North Korea
- Sijo
- Dansimga (P'oŭn's response to Yi Pang-wŏn's sijo)
