= Namdaemun (Kaesong) =

South gate of Kaesong, North Korea

Coordinates: 37°58′09″N 126°33′29″E

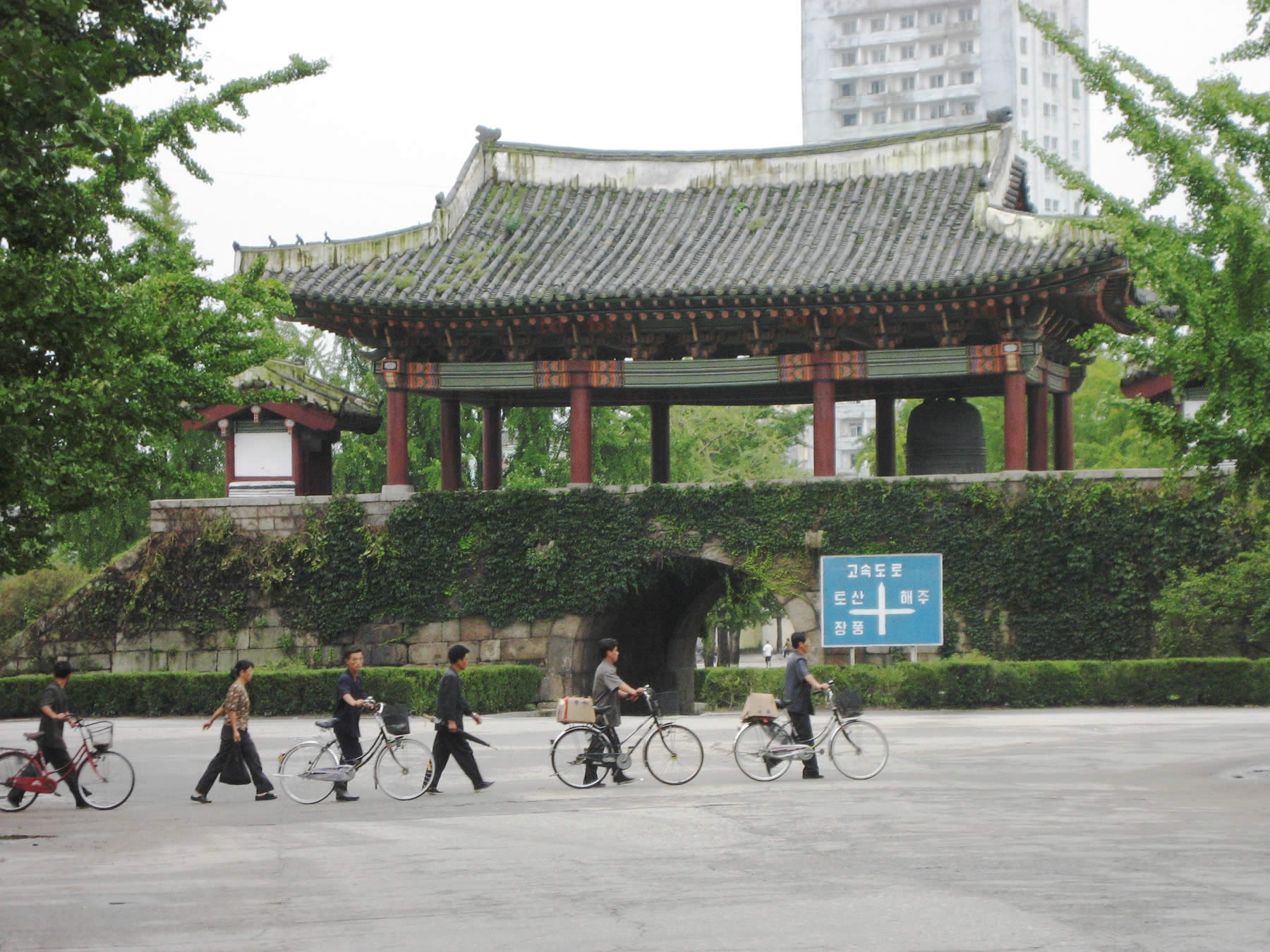

Korean name
- Hangul: 남대문
- Hanja: 南大門
- RR: Namdaemun
- MR: Namdaemun

The Kaesong Namdaemun is the south gate of the old walled city of Kaesong, North Korea. Constructed between 1391 and 1393, it is the only one of the original seven citadel gates to survive mostly intact into the present. Started at the end of the Koryo period in 1391, it was completed three years later under the succeeding Joseon dynasty. It features a stone base topped by a wooden pavilion; however, the pavilion seen today is a 1954 reconstruction as the original was destroyed in 1950 by American bombing during the Korean War. The gate houses the Yŏnbok Bell, cast in 1346 and weighing 14 tonnes. Recovered from Yŏnbok Temple when it was destroyed by fire in 1563, the bell was used to call out the hours until the early 20th century. The gate is National treasure of North Korea no.124.

== See also ==
- National Treasures of North Korea
