= Mausoleum of King Kongmin =

14th century burial site in Kaesong, Korea

Coordinates: 37°58′55″N 126°28′23″E

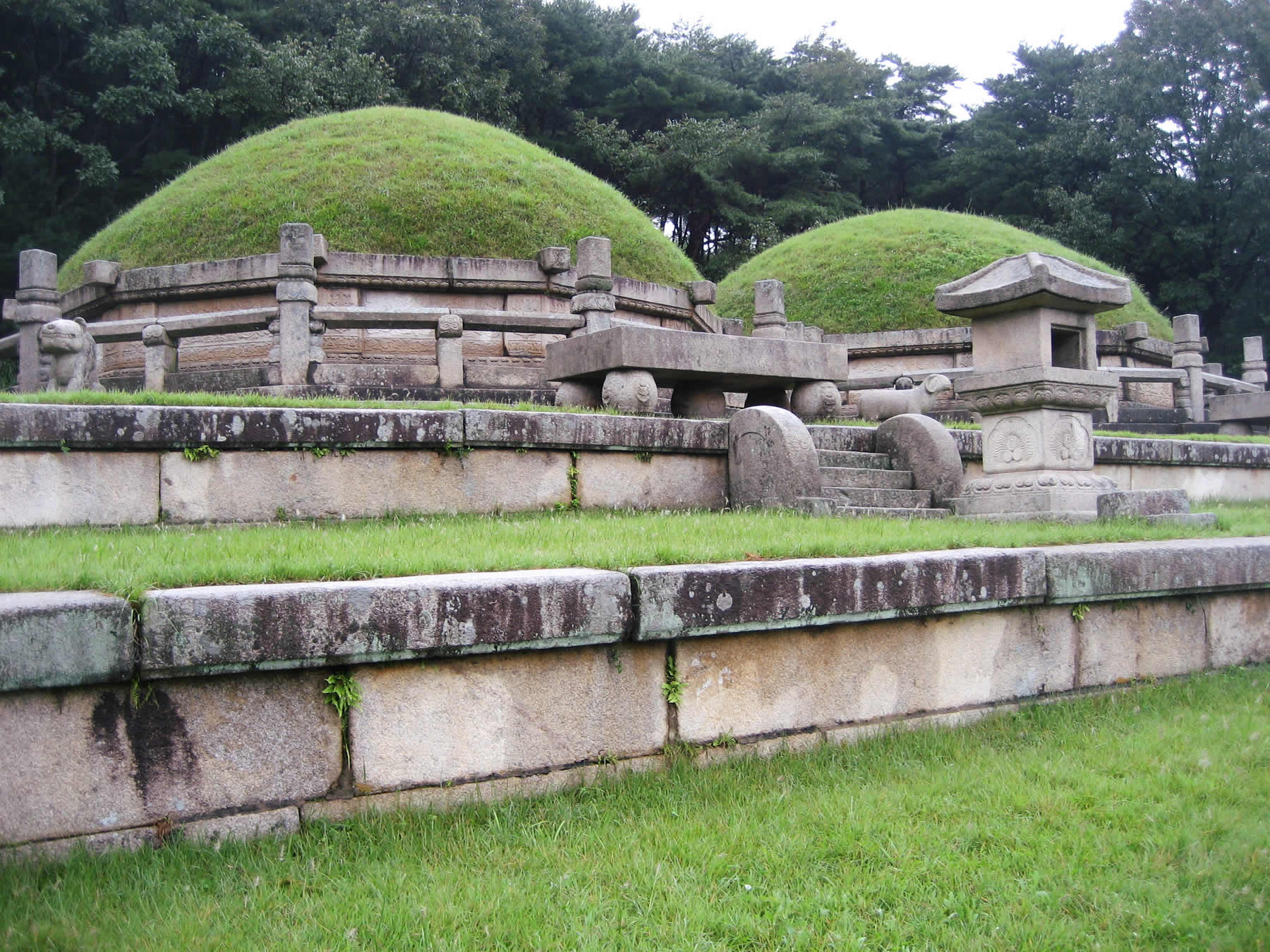

Korean name
- Hangul: 공민왕릉
- Hanja: 恭愍王陵
- RR: Gongminwangneung
- MR: Kongminwangnŭng

Hyeonjeongneung Tomb
- Hangul: 현정릉
- Hanja: 玄正陵
- RR: Hyeonjeongneung
- MR: Hyŏnjŏngnŭng

The Mausoleum of King Kongmin, more correctly known as the Hyonjongnung Royal Tomb, is a 14th-century mausoleum located in Haeson Village, in the city of Kaesong, North Korea. It is one of the Royal Tombs of the Goryeo Dynasty.

The site consists of two separate burial mounds, "Hyonnung", which contain the remains of Gongmin, 31st king of the Goryeo Dynasty, and "Jongnung", which contains Queen Indeok, born the Mongolian princess Budashiri. Nominated for World Heritage status, it is one of the best preserved royal tombs in North Korea which remains in its original state, having avoided extensive restoration under the Communist government.

== History ==
Construction on the tombs began after Queen Indeok's death in 1365, and was completed seven years later in 1372. The tombs consist of a carved granite base topped with a small hill; they are surrounded by statues of sheep and tigers. The tigers represent fierceness and the sheep represent gentleness; in other words om and yang. The "spirit road" up to the tombs is lined with statues of military officers and Confucian officials. Their placement was an important consideration for the king, and many geomancers, astrologers, and mathematicians were consulted to make sure the site had good feng shui (known as pung su in Korean).

A local tale related how the mountain opposite that on which the tombs sit got its name; When Gongmin's wife died, he hired geomancers to find a perfect location for which to place her tomb. Becoming upset when each one failed to please him, he ordered that the next one to try would be given anything they desired if they succeeded; however, if they failed him he would kill them on the spot. When one young geomancer told him to review a spot outside Kaesong, Gongmin secretly told his advisors that if he waved his handkerchief they should execute the geomancer.

While the geomancer took the king's subjects to the spot where the tomb is now located, Gongmin climbed the one opposite to review the site. When he reached the top of the mountain, exhausted, he dabbed his brow and surveyed the area; delightedly, he found it to be perfect and prepared to personally congratulate the young man. However, upon climbing down the mountain he found that the man had been executed; the subjects had seen him wipe his brow and thought that he had wanted the man executed. Hearing of his foolishness, the King exclaimed "Oh, my!"; his subjects then named the mountain this as a memorial to the story.

The tomb's relics were lost in 1905 when the tomb chamber was blasted opened with dynamite and looted by the Japanese; most of the relics inside were believed to be taken to Japan, though Gongmin's coffin is currently exhibited in the Goryeo Museum in Kaesong.

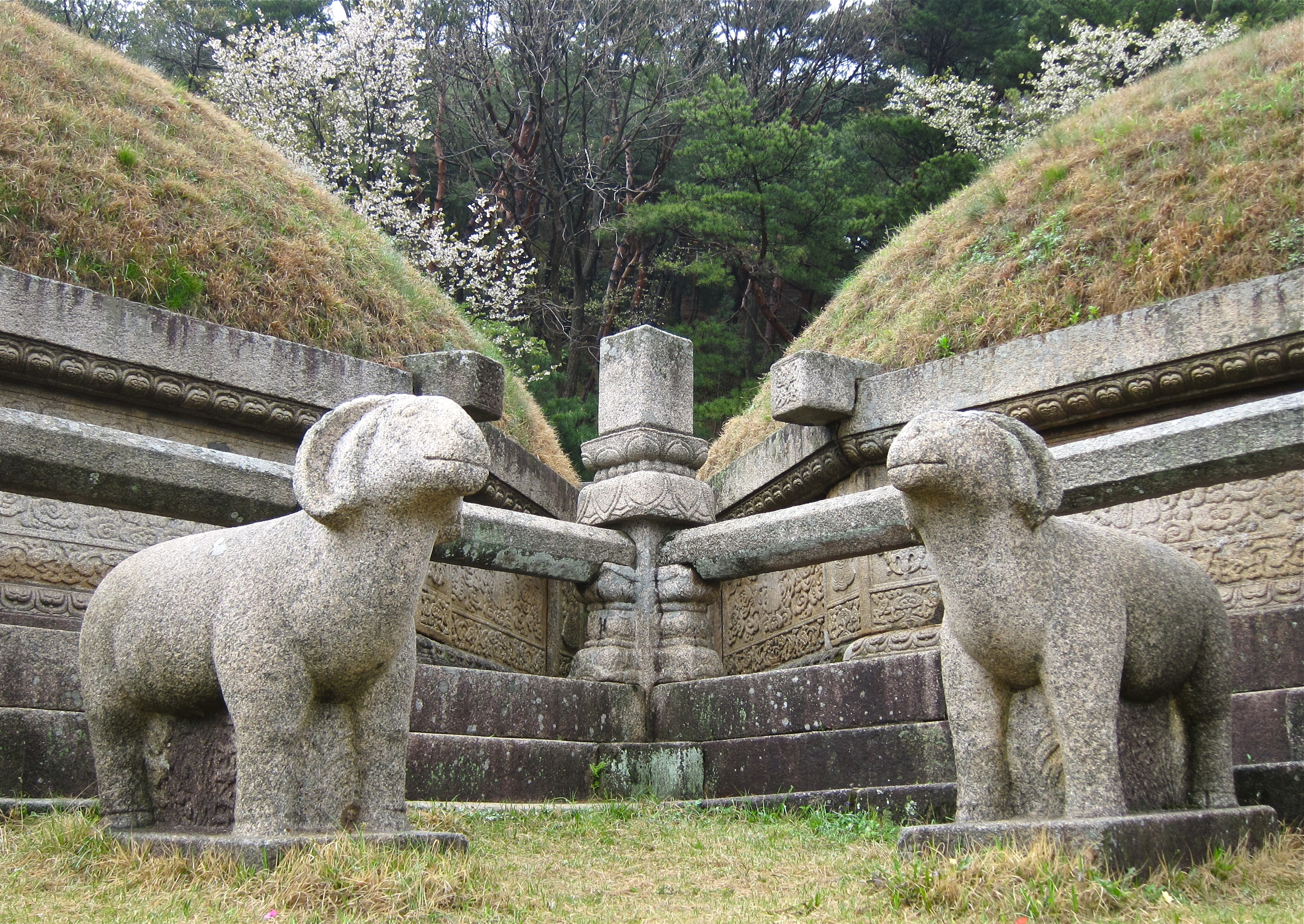
Stone sheep (yangsok)

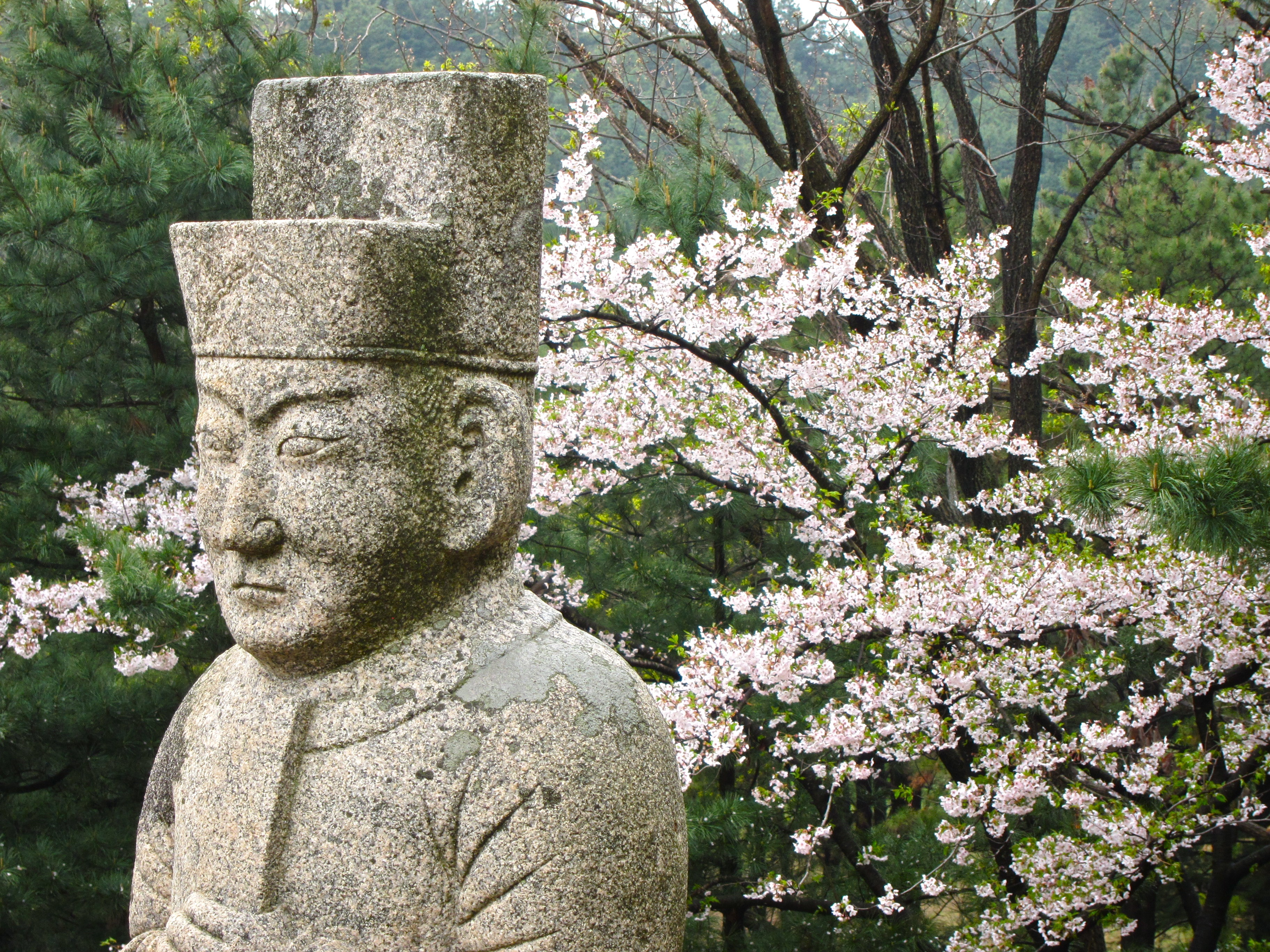
A statue of Muninseok
(State civil official)

== See also ==
- Royal Tombs of the Goryeo Dynasty
- National Treasures of North Korea
