= Kaesong Chomsongdae =

Observatory in Kaesong, North Korea

UNESCO World Heritage Site
- Location within North Korea
- Location: Kaesong in North Korea
- Part of: Historic Monuments and Sites in Kaesong
- Criteria: (ii), (iii)
- Reference: 1278
- Inscription: 2013 (37th Session)
- Area: 43.5 ha (107 acres)
- Buffer zone: 5,222.1 ha (12,904 acres)
- Coordinates: 37°59′12″N 126°32′23″E

- Kaesong Chomsongdae
- Chosŏn'gŭl: 개성첨성대
- Hancha: 開城瞻星臺
- Revised Romanization: Gaeseong Cheomseongdae
- McCune–Reischauer: Kaesŏng Ch'ŏmsŏngdae

The Kaesong Chomsongdae Observatory is located in Songak-dong, Kaesong, North Korea. It was an astronomical observatory during the Koryo period. Now only a granite platform remains, the sides of which coincide with the main cardinal points.

Dating from the early 10th century, it is regarded as the oldest structure for astronomical surveys in the world (together with its counterpart in Kyongju). The Goryeosa describes the structure: “Chomsongdae is west of the Manwoldae. It looks like a squared watchtower made of stone columns, seven chok (210cm) on each side and eight chok high (240cm). In the old days there was an apparatus for surveying the heavens, but now it is covered heavily with ivy and is antique-looking.” In 1936, the structure was described as follows: "The present status of the observatory consists of a stone platform about ten feet square supported by five upright stones ten feet high. On the top of the platform at the corners are holes in the stones about six inches in diameter that appear like footings for pillars to support another story."

The structure is made of over 360 granite stones, indicative of the passage of one year. It was used for astronomical and meteorological observation, with equipment at the top used in the observation of changing weather and the movement of celestial bodies.

It is listed as one of the National Treasures of North Korea. A one-third scale model of the Observatory is on display at the Korean Central History Museum. A larger model is also in front of the National Science Museum in South Korea, featured as an outdoor exhibit.
