= Songgyungwan =

Coordinates: 37°59′31″N 126°34′15″E

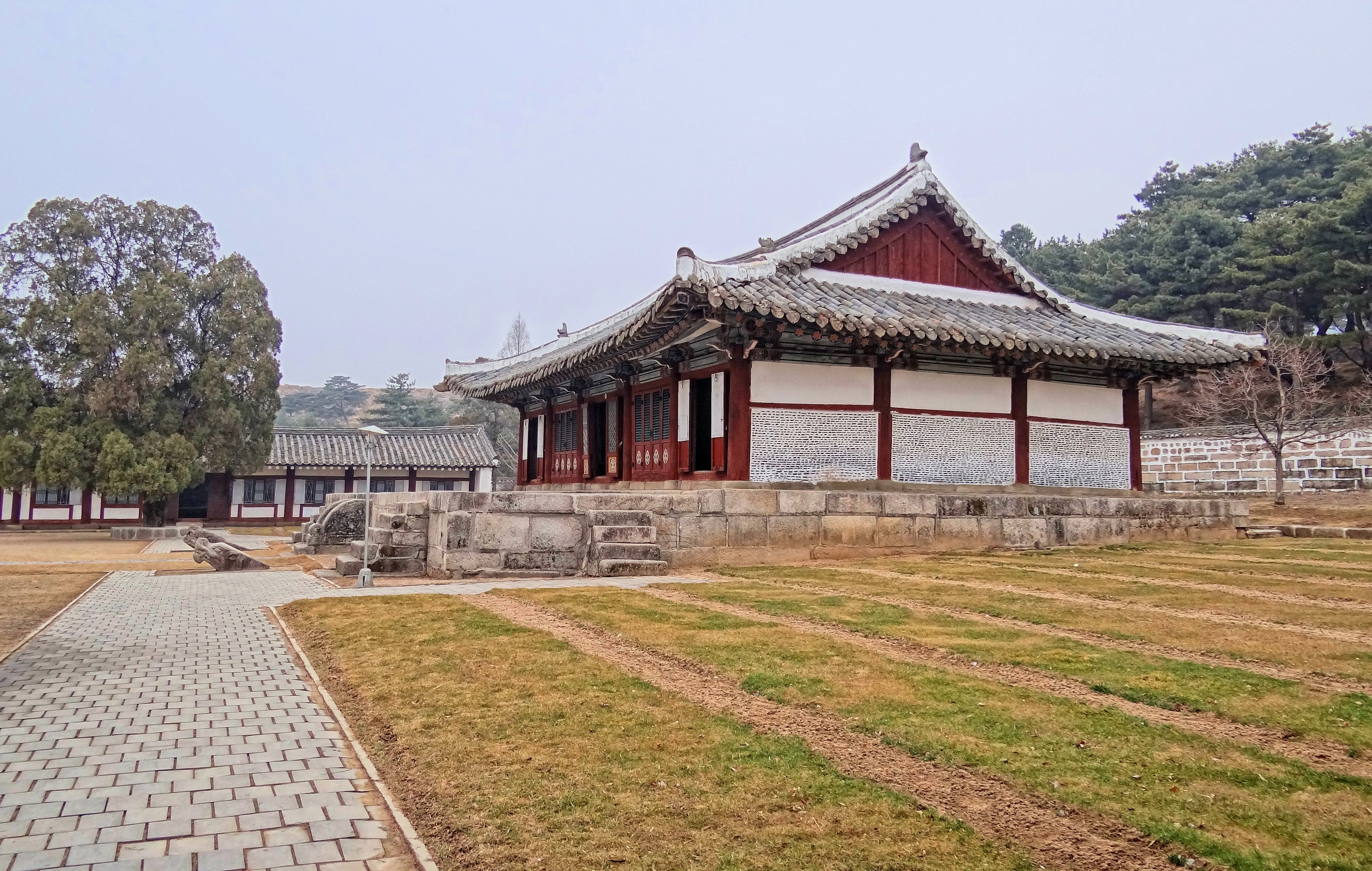

Korean name
- Hangul: 성균관
- Hanja: 成均館
- RR: Seonggyungwan
- MR: Sŏnggyun'gwan

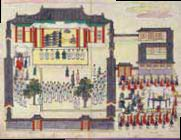
Scene from a five panel painting showing the Korean crown prince starting his studies at the Songgyungwan academy

The Songgyungwan was the highest educational institution established in Korea during the Koryo and Choson dynasties. It opened in 992. The institution consists of the Taesong Temple, Myongnyun Hall and 20 other buildings, including one of the largest wooden buildings to still exist in the DPRK.

Songgyungwan is located two kilometers to the northeast of the center of the city of Kaesong. Since 1987, it has housed the Koryo Museum.

== History ==
Songgyungwan was originally a palace outbuilding called known as "Taemyon". The institution was built by King Munjong, the eleventh king of Koryo and was designated as the principal teaching institute in 1089. The facility was given the name Songgyungwan in 1308. It was destroyed by fire in 1592 during the Imchin War. The institution's twenty buildings date from its reconstruction, which started in 1602; they comply with the characteristics required of a Confucian educational establishment of the period.

It taught Confucianism and developed students' ability to handle political and other "practical affairs". Songgyungwan prepared young aristocratic men for the civil service and was the center of Confucian studies in the dynasty. The institution had the particular responsibility of educating the Crown Prince who, on being invested with that title, underwent the state ceremony of iphak (입학) or commencement of learning at the Songgyungwan in accordance with the code of the Iphakrye (입학례) as stipulated in the Kukcho oryeui (국조오례의 "Book on the Five Rites of the State"). The school remained the national seat of learning until the capital was moved to Hansŏng under the Choson dynasty, where the current Sungkyunkwan University became the new national university.

Chŏng Mong-ju passed his civil service examinations at the age of 23 and became an instructor of Neo-Confucianism at the Songgyungwan Academy in 1367.

== Current status ==
The old buildings are not well-suited to the role of a museum, as they lack proper conditions for the conservation and presentation of works of art, and are ill-suited for the reception of visitors.
