= List of tourist attractions in Pyongyang =

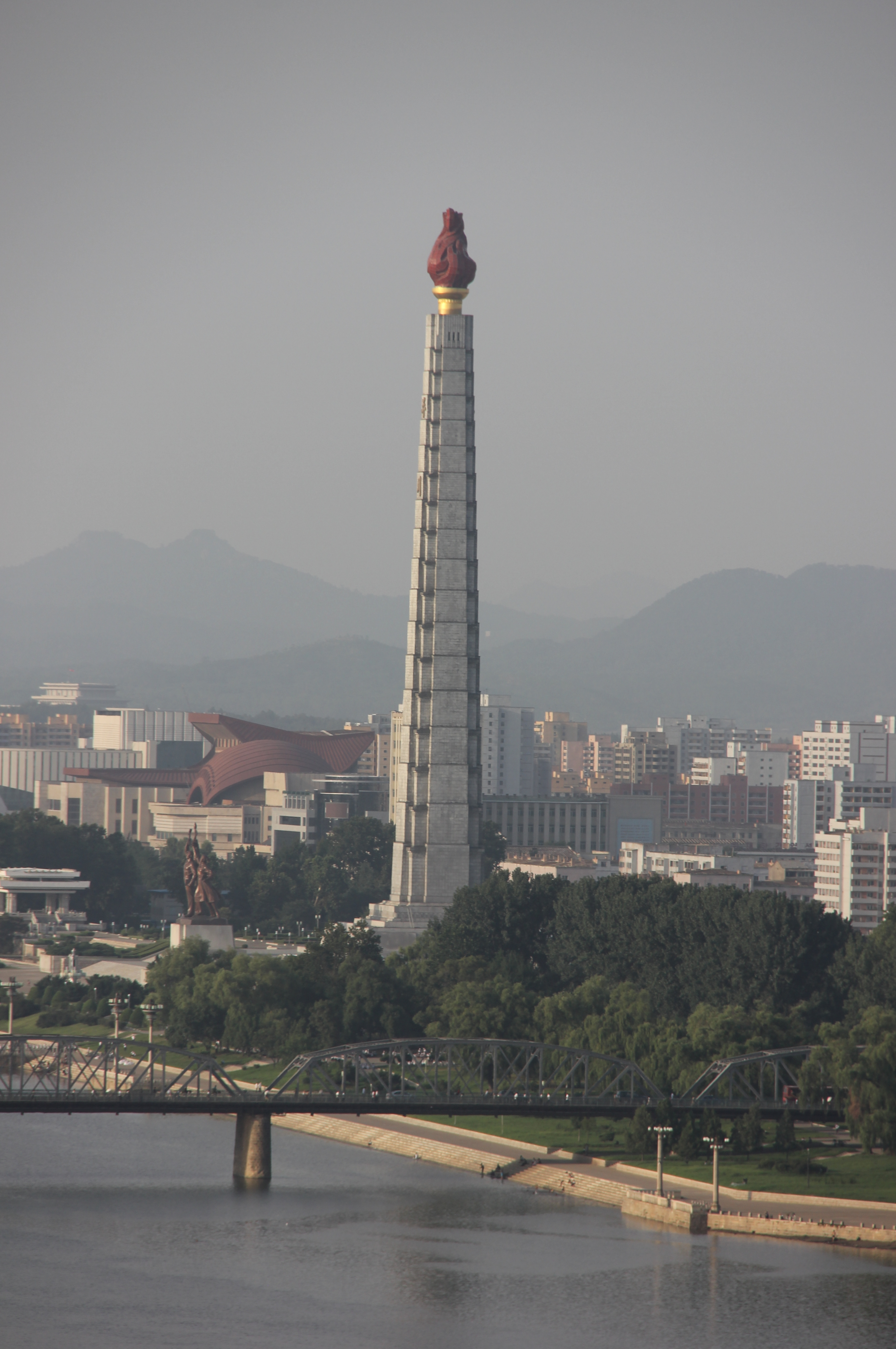
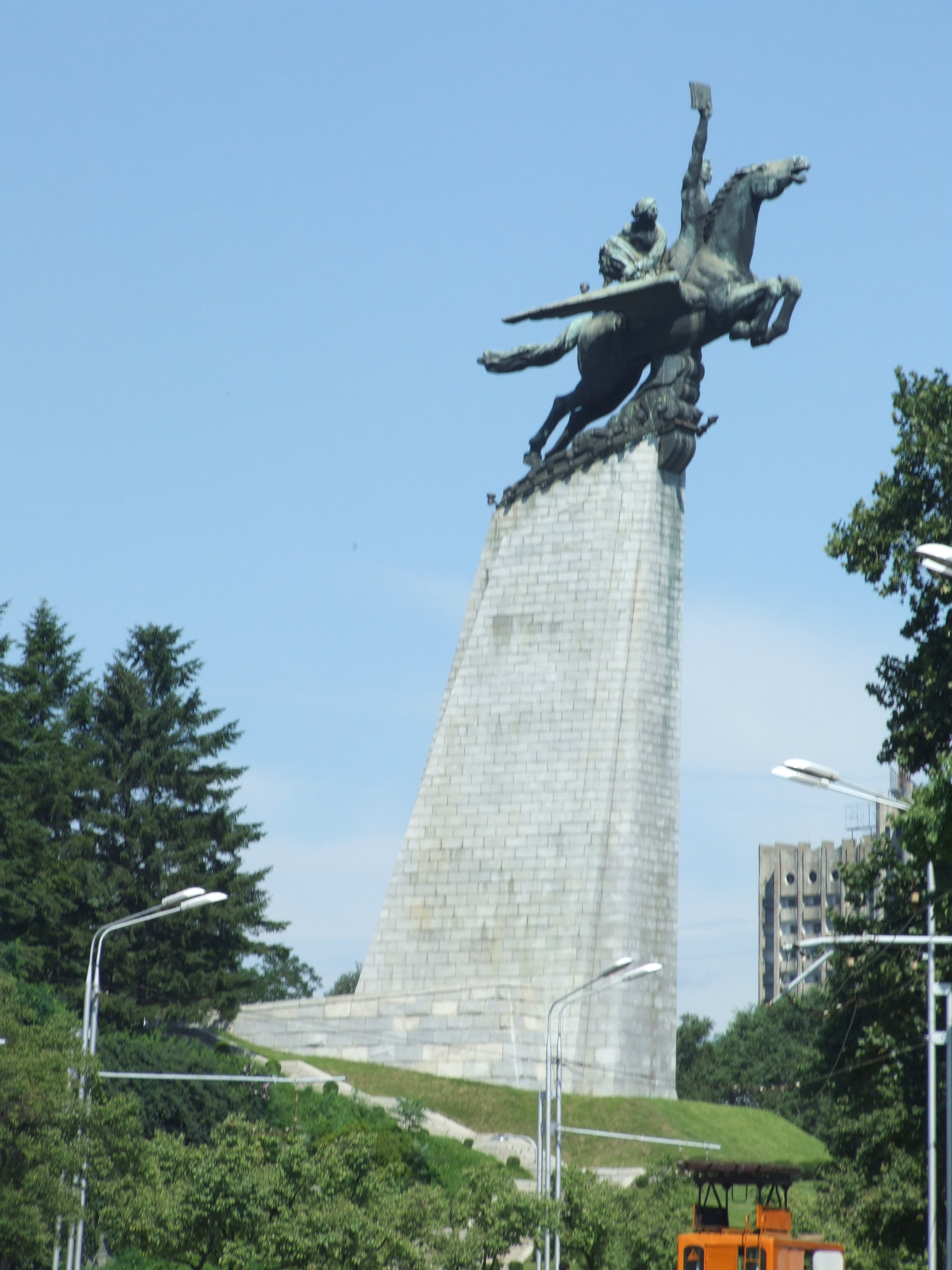
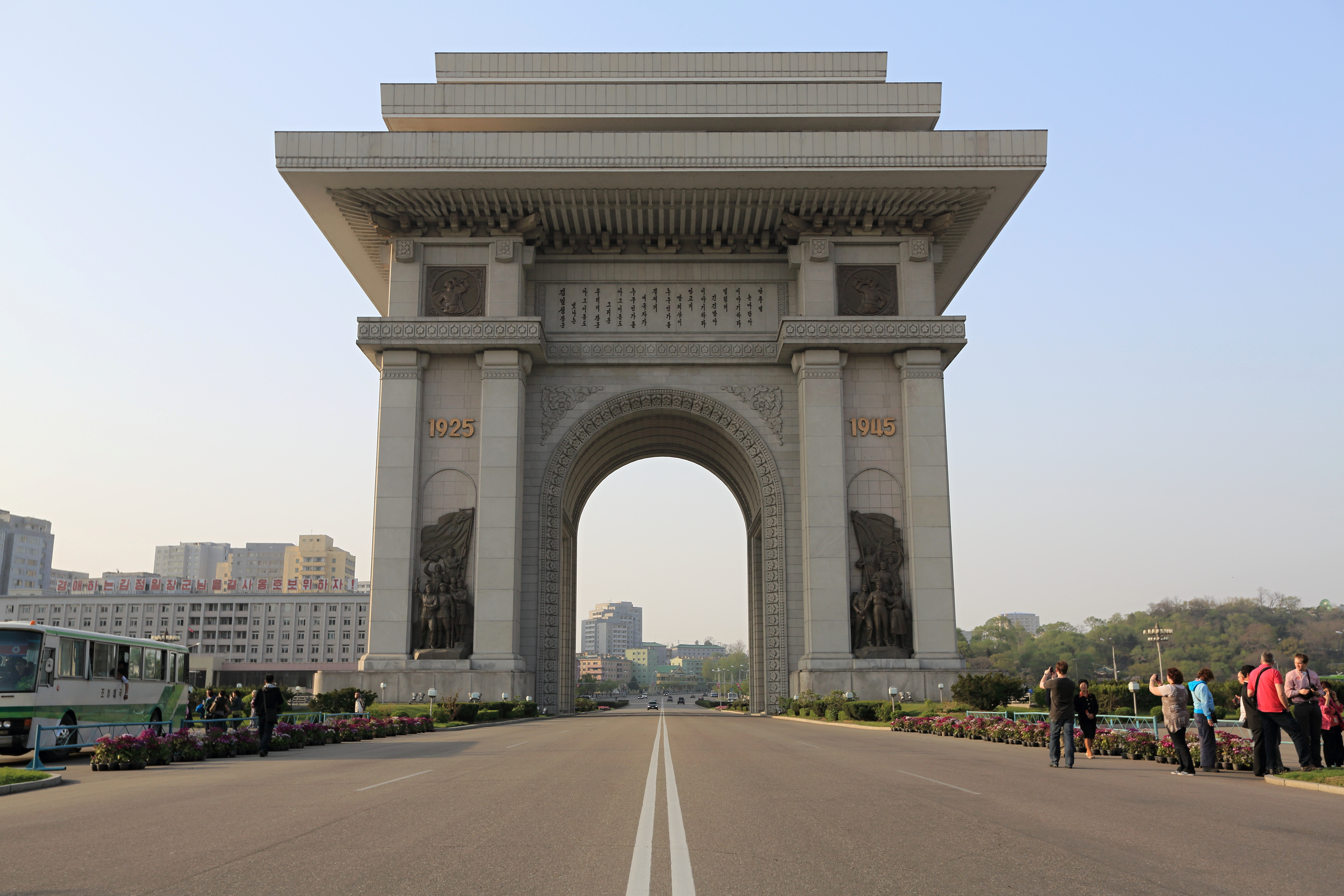
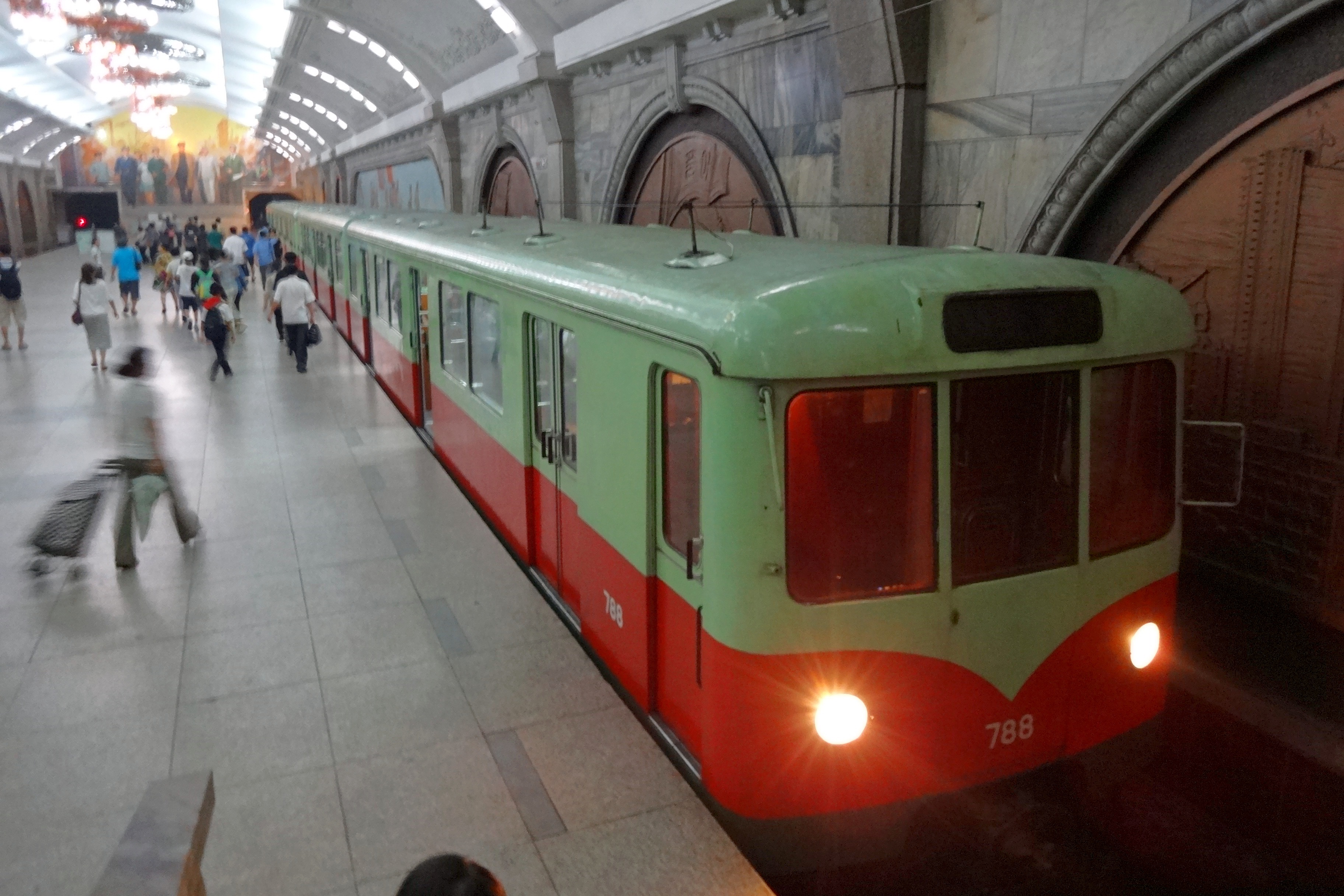
Juche Tower, Chollima Statue, Arch of Triumph, Pyongyang Metro

There are many tourist attractions in Pyongyang, the capital of North Korea. Many are unique as remnants of communist iconography and monumentalist and brutalist architecture. Tourists are not allowed to move freely and the authorities control which sights visitors can access.

== List ==
- 18 September Nursery
- Academy of Koryo Medicine
- Athletics Gymnasium
- April 25 House of Culture
- Arch of Triumph
- Basketball Gymnasium
- Central Botanical Gardens
- Central Youth Hall
- Changgwang Health Complex
- Chilsongmun
- Chollima Statue
- Chongnyu Restaurant
- Combat Sports Gymnasium
- East Pyongyang Grand Theatre
- East Pyongyang No. 1 Middle School
- Grand People's Study House
- Handball Gymnasium
- Indoor Swimming Pool Complex
- International Cinema Hall
- Juche Tower
- Kaeson Youth Park
- Kang Ban-sok Advanced Middle School
- Kim Chaek University of Technology
- Kim Hyong Jik University of Education
- Kim Il-sung Square
- Kim Il-sung Stadium
- Kim Il-sung University
- Kim Song-ju Elementary School
- Kim Won-gyun University of Music
- Kimilsungia and Kimjongilia Exhibition Hall
- Korea Central Zoo
- Korea Stamp Exhibition Hall
- Korea Stamp Museum
- Korean Art Gallery
- Korean Central History Museum
- Korean People's Army Circus
- Korean People's Army Military Hardware Museum
- Korean Revolution Museum
- Kumrung Leisure Complex
- Kumsusan Palace of the Sun
- Kwangbopsa
- Mangyongdae Children's Palace
- Mangyongdae Funfair
- Mangyongdae Wading Pool
- Mangyongdae
- Mansu Hill Grand Monument
- Mansudae Art Studio
- Mansudae Art Theatre
- Mausoleum of Tangun
- Meari Shooting Range
- Mirae Scientists Street
- Mirim Horse Riding Club
- Monument to Party Founding
- Moranbong Park
- Moranbong Theatre
- Munsu Water Park
- Okryu Children's Hospital
- Okryu-gwan
- Party Founding Museum
- People's Palace of Culture
- People's Theatre
- Pothonggang Circus Theatre
- Potongmun
- Pyongyang Bell
- Pyongyang Circus
- Pyongyang Embroidery Institute
- Pyongyang Gold Lane
- Pyongyang Grand Theatre
- Pyongyang Indoor Stadium
- Pyongyang Informatics Centre
- Pyongyang International Football School
- Pyongyang International House of Culture
- Pyongyang Maternity Hospital
- Pyongyang Metro
- Pyongyang Ostrich Farm
- Pyongyang Peoples Outdoor Ice Rink
- Pyongyang Skatepark
- Pyongyang Students and Children's Palace
- Railway Revolution Museum
- Revolutionary Martyrs' Cemetery
- Rungra People's Pleasure Ground
- Rungra Waterpark
- Rungrado 1st of May Stadium
- Ryongak Mountain
- Ryongwang Pavilion
- Sosan Stadium
- State Gift Hall
- Table-Tennis Gymnasium
- Taedongmun
- Taekwon-Do Hall
- Taesong Fortress
- Taesongsan Pleasure Ground
- Three Revolutions Exhibition
- Tomb of King Tongmyŏng
- Ulmil Pavilion
- USS Pueblo (AGER-2)
- Victorious War Museum
- Volleyball Gymnasium
- Weightlifting Gymnasium
- Wrestling Gymnasium

== See also ==
- List of amusement parks in North Korea
- List of football stadiums in North Korea
- List of hotels in North Korea
- List of museums in North Korea
- List of theatres in North Korea
- Revolutionary Sites
- Tourism in North Korea
