= 13th World Festival of Youth and Students =

1989 event in Pyongyang, North Korea

The 13th World Festival of Youth and Students 제13차 세계청년학생축전
- Host country: North Korea
- Date: 1989
- Motto: For Anti-Imperialist Solidarity, Peace and Friendship
- Cities: Pyongyang
- Participants: 22,000, from 180 countries
- Follows: 12th World Festival of Youth and Students
- Precedes: 14th World Festival of Youth and Students

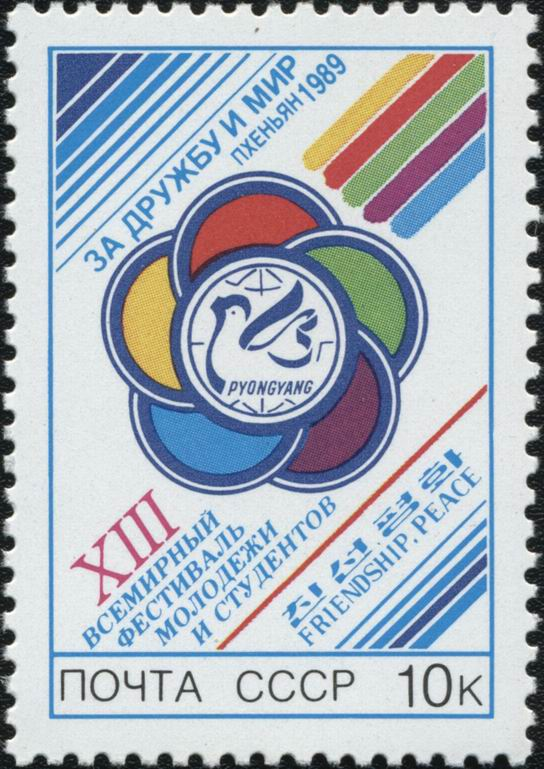
Soviet stamp promoting the 13th World Festival of Youth and Students

The 13th World Festival of Youth and Students (WFYS) was held from 1–8 July 1989 in Pyongyang, the capital of North Korea, and was organized by the World Federation of Democratic Youth. It was the largest international event staged in North Korea up until then.

The event took four years of preparation by the North Korean government, which effectively spent a quarter of the country's yearly budget (US$4.5 billion) on it, reportedly contributing to North Korea's economic downturn in the 1990s. The government built elaborate stadiums, shipped in Mercedes-Benz vehicles to tote around foreigners, and undertook other expensive architectural projects. Ultimately declared as the largest ever World Festival of Youth and Students, about 22,000 people from 177 countries took part in the festival, including 100 people from the United States. For eight days starting on 1 July 1989, the students participated in political discussions, sports competitions, and other activities. Many accounts described the festival as a reaction to Seoul's hosting of the 1988 Summer Olympics, which North Korea boycotted after blowing the opportunity to co-host the Olympics.

This event was the last festival held during the Cold War era as waves of unrest began to occur throughout the communist world later on in the year.

== Leading up to the event ==
North Korea went through years of planning and building in preparation for the event. Plans for event infrastructure had already been drawn up in case Pyongyang would co-host the 1988 Olympics along with Seoul. The $200-million Rungrado May Day Stadium was commissioned to serve as the festival's main venue, its construction officially completed in time for the festival on 1 May 1989. At the time it was the largest stadium in Asia, capable of seating 150,000 people.

A total of 260 new buildings and venues were constructed for the event, including Central Youth Hall, East Pyongyang Grand Theatre, Pyongyang Circus and Kwangbok Street.

The North Korean government also worked with a South Korean student organization, the National Council of Student Representatives (Jeondaehyeop), which was organized on 19 August 1987. The organization concentrated its efforts on getting South Korean participation in order to express its anti-US and pro-reunification commitment. The group secretly sent one of its members, Lim Su-kyung, to the festival.

Numerous posters aimed at both domestic and international audiences were created to promote the event. These posters used imagery including Korean mythology, foreign participants and Pyongyang landmarks, and three different event logos were used on different posters.

== Event ==
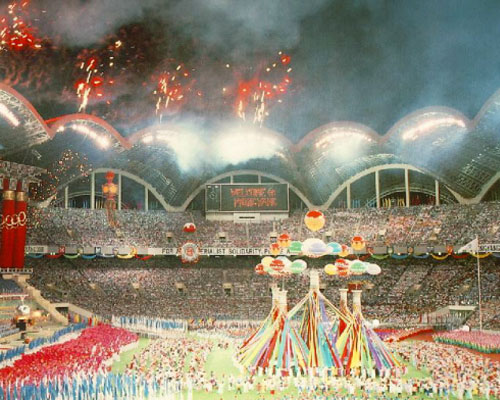
Opening festivities were held at the Rungrado May Day stadium

On 1 July 1989, about 22,000 young people from 177 countries gathered in the Rungrado 1 May Stadium to inaugurate the festival. For eight days, the participants took part in social, cultural, sports and political activities. The slogan of the festival was "For Anti-Imperialist Solidarity, Peace and Friendship".

It was the first festival held in Asia and the first time the United States Department of Treasury allowed a group to travel to North Korea since the Korean War. Throughout this delegation's and others' time in Korea, however, the North Korean government imposed boundaries and restrictions on foreigners' movements and behavior, as well as constant surveillance over its own population.

Danish activists caused a stir during the opening ceremony of the festival when they unfurled a banner criticizing North Korea's human rights abuses. Two of the three activists were taken into custody but soon released.

At the festival, well over 1,000 events took place, from round-table political discussions, solidarity rallies, and plenary sessions, to sports matches, artistic performances, film showings and visits around Pyongyang and beyond. The political events of the festival primarily focused on anti-imperialist discussions as well as subjects such as peace and disarmament, nonalignment, human rights, and rights for youth and others. There were also frequent bilateral meetings arranged for two countries at a time to talk over issues of economic and political concern.

Each of the eight days of the festival was devoted to a specific theme:

- Opening ceremonies
- Peace
- Independence and national liberation struggles
- Environmental crisis
- Friendship and international solidarity
- Rights of youth and students
- Day of the host country
- Closing ceremonies

Pyongyang declined Seoul's offer to contribute resources to festival events, particularly electronic equipment for the opening ceremony at the May Day Stadium. Three officials of the South Korean government did attend the festival, although their presence there was a secret at the time.

=== Lim Su-kyung's participation ===
A South Korean student named Lim Su-kyung became a poster child for the event, the North Korean government greatly publicizing her presence at the festival. The South Korean government, then dominated by hardline anti-communists, had banned its citizens from attending the event, but Lim Su-kyung's student association ignored the ban. Upon her arrival in Pyongyang, and throughout her time in North Korea, the public treated Lim like a celebrity, asking her questions about her ideology and broadcasting her activities during and after the visit. Dubbed the "Flower of Reunification", Lim was hailed by the North Korean government as a hero who sacrificed herself at the altar of Korean reunification.

However, Lim's public appearance also revealed the positive elements of being a South Korean youth. In contrast to the North Koreans' understanding that South Koreans lived a repressed life ridden with unhappiness and starvation under the colonial rule of the United States, they observed a healthy and well-spoken youth who expressed a willingness to give unscripted political statements to high officials.

After the festival, Lim Su-kyung crossed the border back into South Korea, and the South Korean government, as forewarned, imprisoned her. The North Korean government then broadcast an interview with Lim Su-kyung's family in Seoul to its general population. Instead of portraying the harshness of the South Korean regime, the North Korean government showed the family in a nice home. To the puzzlement of the North Korean viewers, the family of a "political criminal" was not imprisoned and even allowed to stay in their home and keep their jobs.

Some historians have concluded that North Korea failed to represent the superiority and popularity of its ideology through Lim Su-kyung. She interacted with North Koreans and gave her opinions on controversial matters, ultimately to the chagrin of North Korean officials, since she unexpectedly demonstrated the positive aspects of living in the South.

== Reception ==
Contemporary news reports in the Western world in general saw the festival as a failed effort on the part of Kim Il Sung, and the North Korean government, to increase their standing in the international community. Through constant surveillance of the population and other restrictions, the North Korean government attempted to shield its population from foreign influence, but inevitably the festival had an external impact on the home population.

Twenty journalists from the United States attended the festival. Nicholas Kristof recounted that "native North Koreans seem willing and happy to talk to foreigners, but conversations often sound exceedingly unnatural and fake and that it is rare for a minute to pass without a Korean offering praise to the 77-year-old 'great leader'."

Some historians, however, posit that reporters rhetorically reduced the coverage of the festival to the North Korea / South Korea issue and the regime of North Korea, failing to discuss the actual content of the festival. From this perspective, reporters reducing the festival to a mere manipulation device for North Korea were guilty of the same qualities they sought to criticize. Some claim this journalistic bias gave a skewed international perception of the true meaning of the festival.

== Historical significance ==
Hosting the Youth Festival had long lasting consequences for the North Korean government and its worldwide standing. After funneling billions of dollars into the festival's production, North Korea ended up owing five billion dollars in foreign debt and was considered bankrupt by creditor nations. This damaged the country's economy and external status. The extravagant expenditures put North Korea into a hole it could not get out of, exacerbated by unfavourable economic conditions in the next decade with the fall of the Soviet Union and concurrent famine.

Also, Lim Su-kyung as well as other representations of the outside world had unintended effects on the North Korean public. Contrary to some Western predictions that the inflow of foreign influence would contribute to North Korea's openness, after the festival Pyongyang tightened its control over its population in order to "wipe out all the remnants of 'foreign culture'". Historians such as Induk Kang believe North Korea reasserted its isolationism because its survival depended on the control of information into the country.

Historian Andrei Lankov has concluded that even though the country increased information control after the festival, "this was the beginning of major changes" in the infiltration of foreign influence into North Korea, which led to a negative impact on the regime's political legitimacy. In the subsequent decade, advances in media technology and loosening of border controls with China caused further change in North Koreans' perception of the outside world.

The Pyongyang Youth Festival is widely considered North Korea's competitive reaction to the Seoul Olympics, and ultimately the festival strained relations with South Korea. Yet prior to the festival, the media portrayed an optimistic outlook on Korean relations, largely due to the 7 July (1988) Declaration in which the South Korea president Roh Tae-woo regarded North Korea as a co-partner for achieving mutual prosperity. However, following the Pyongyang festival, "these confrontational feelings between the north and south began spreading widely among the masses of both sides," according to Induk Kang. After the festival, the South Korean president increased the stakes for reconciliation by demanding that the North change its political structure as a precondition to reunification, something usually only presented by the northern side. Therefore, the festival undermined previous reconciliation efforts between North and South Korea and caused them both to raise more uncooperative demands.

Posters used to promote the event had a lasting impact on the style of artwork used by North Korea to promote its later events, with motifs reused in posters for 1995's Pyongyang International Sports and Culture Festival for Peace (also known as Collision in Korea), the April Spring Friendship Art Festival, the Pyongyang International Film Festival and Arirang Mass Games.

== See also ==
- World Festival of Youth and Students
- World Federation of Democratic Youth
- Rungrado May Day Stadium
