= Mansudae =

Mansudae is a phonetic transliteration of the Korean name for Mansu Hill, though it may also refer to:

== Arts and entertainment ==
- Mansudae Art Studio, a major art production studio in Pyongyang, North Korea
- Mansudae Overseas Projects, a division of the above, operating in other countries
- Mansudae Grand Monument, a monument complex in Pyongyang
- Mansudae Art Theatre, a theatre in Pyongyang
- Mansudae People's Theatre, a theatre in Pyongyang
- Mansudae Art Troupe, a North Korean musical troupe
- Mansudae Television a North Korean state-owned TV channel

== Other uses ==
- Pyongyang Assembly Hall, formerly known as the Mansudae Assembly Hall, seat of the Supreme People's Assembly
- Mansudae Apartments, a high-rise apartment complex in Pyongyang
