= Kaeson Revolutionary Site =

Revolutionary site in Pyongyang, North Korea

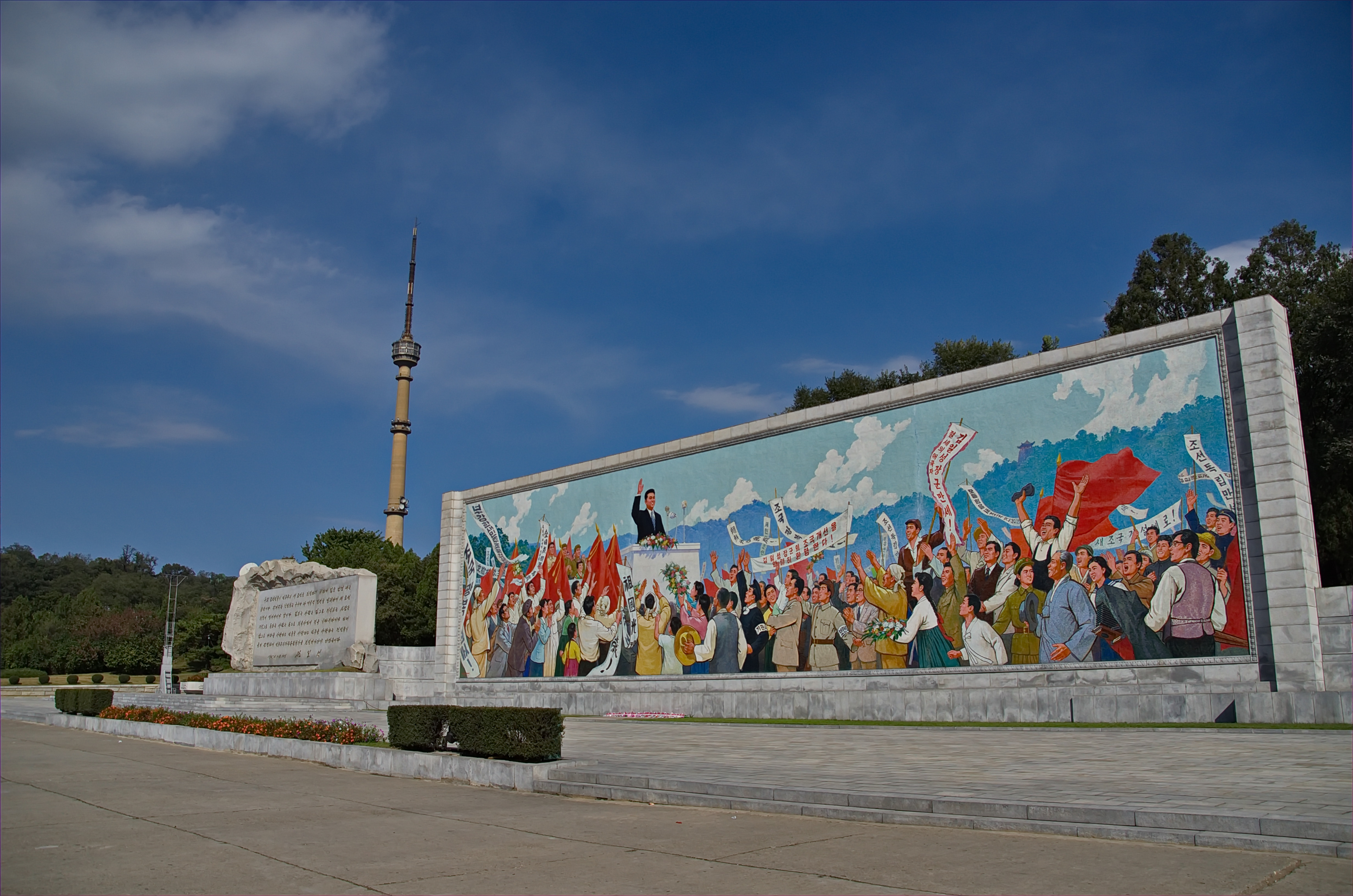
- Interactive map of Kaeson Revolutionary Site
- 39°02′44″N 125°45′20″E
- Location: Moranbong, Pyongyang

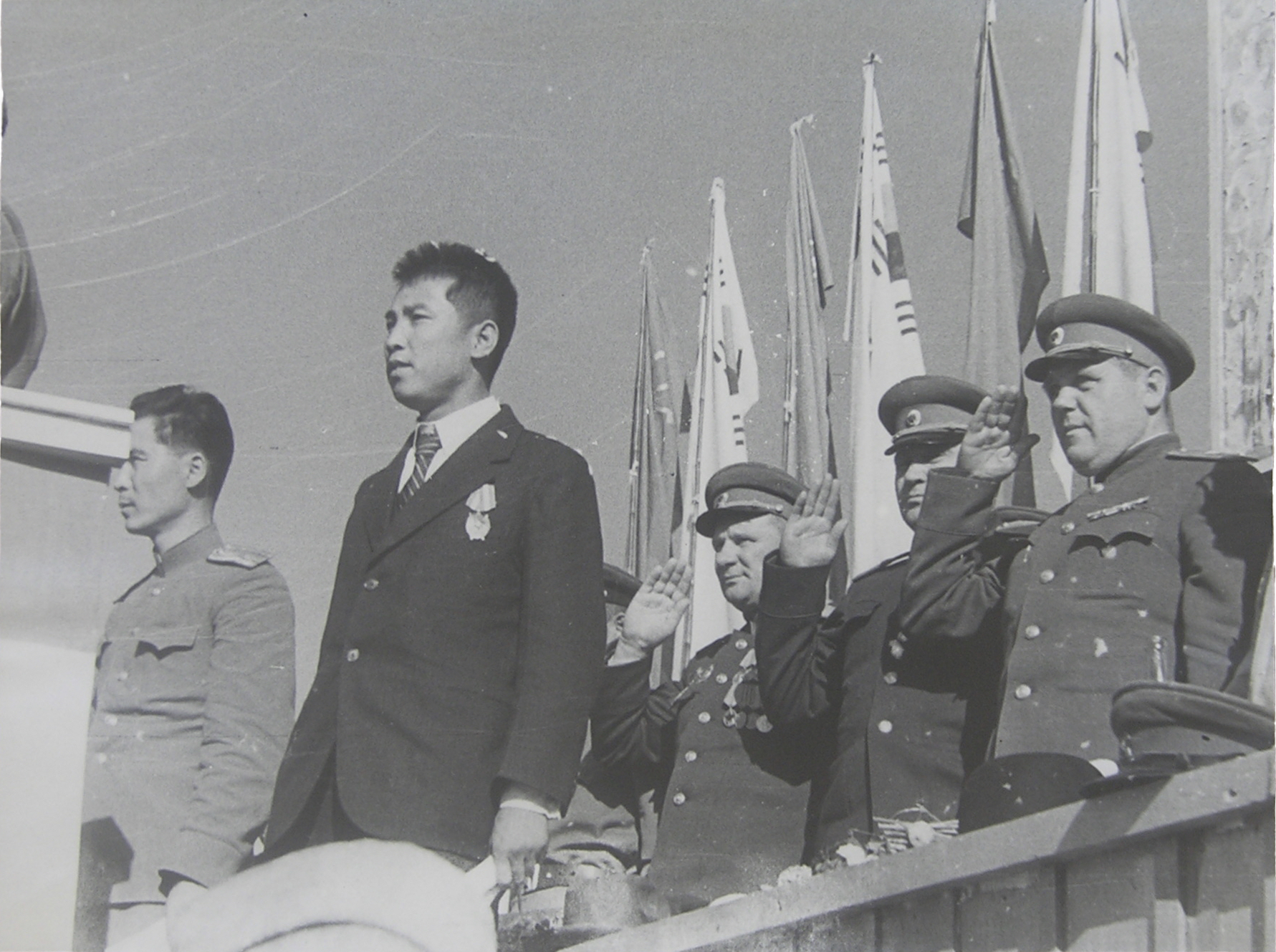
Contemporary photograph of Kim Il Sung delivering his speech

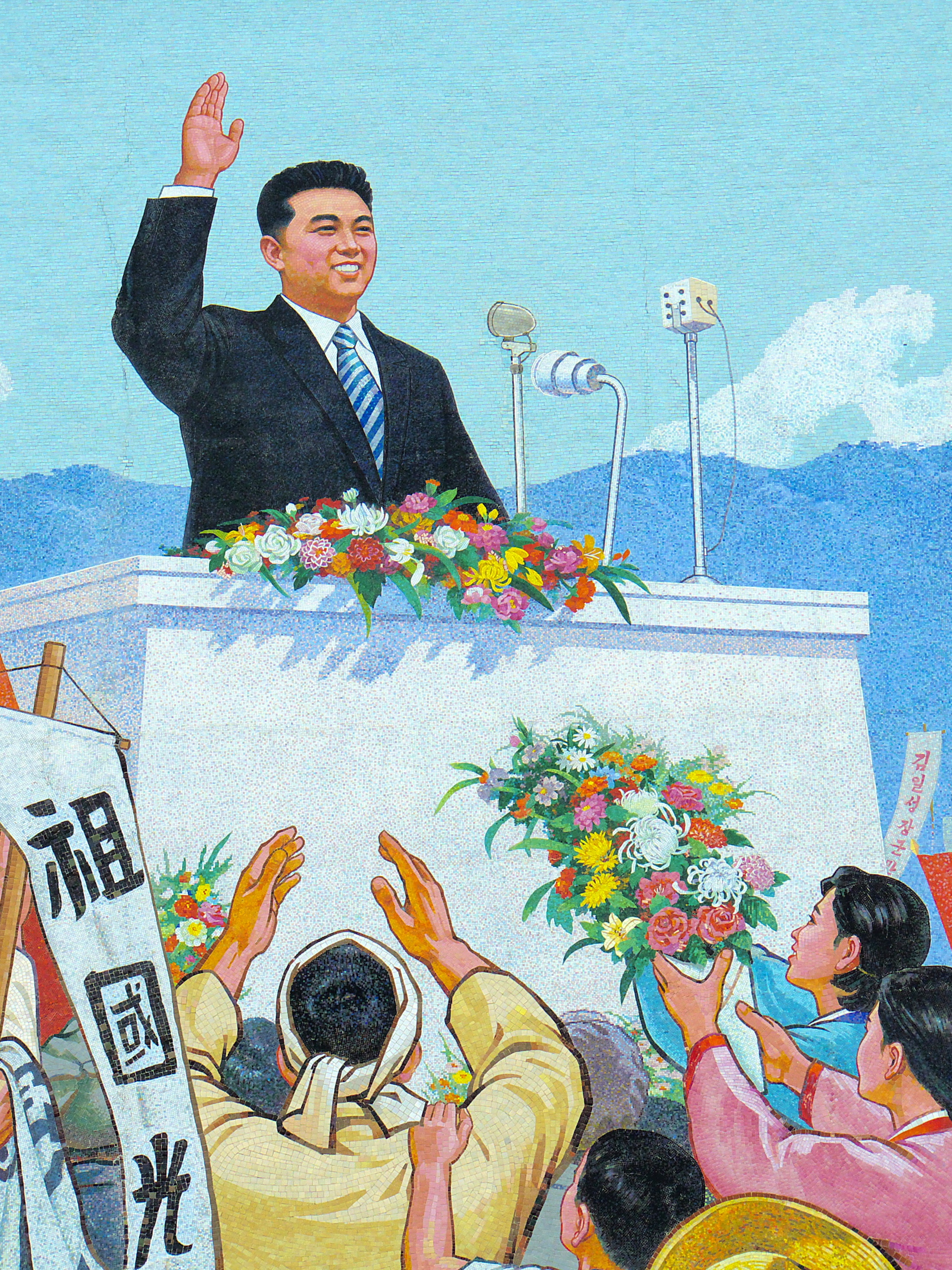
Detail from the mural

Kaeson Revolutionary Site (Korean: 개선혁명사적지) is a Revolutionary Site in Pyongyang. It marks the spot near Kim Il Sung Stadium where Kim Il Sung delivered his victory speech after the liberation of Korea on 14 October 1945, entitled "Every Effort for the Building of a New Democratic Korea". At that time, the place was called the Pyongyang Public Ground (평양공설운동장). There is a mural depicting the scene at the site. A quotation from the speech is carved in stone reads: "To contribute positively to the work of building the state, let those with strength give strength, let those with knowledge give knowledge, let those with money give money". The site is located in the Moranbong area, west of the hill of the same name.

The speech was the first opportunity for many to see Kim Il Sung in person, after he already had a reputation for his guerrilla activities. The rally at which Kim spoke was sponsored by the Soviets. About 300,000 people took part. Contemporary photographs show Kim surrounded by Red Army personnel and wearing Soviet medals. These facts are not reproduced in the mural.

The site was dedicated in 1987. It is just across the street from the Arch of Triumph, which is a related but more famous landmark, marking the spot where Kim Il Sung entered Pyongyang in August 1945 when the city was liberated.

== See also ==
- List of tourist attractions in Pyongyang
- Propaganda in North Korea
