= Tale of Nanggan =

Korean legend

The Tale of Nanggan is a Korean legend.

== Synopsis ==
Long ago, there was a fisherman named Yi Chinsu (이진수. Some documents refer to him as Yi Kyŏngsu (이경수)) lived outside the Jujak Gate in Pyongyang with his wife and their only daughter, Nanggan (낭간). One day, while he was fishing in the Taedong River, a beautiful woman appeared from the water. She guided him to the Dragon Palace, where he spent a delightful day with the Dragon Princess. Upon parting, the Princess gave him a souvenir called a "mermaid," which was shaped like Korean ginseng. Eating it would allow one to maintain youth and beauty for a thousand years.

Yi Chinsu hid the mermaid on a shelf, but his daughter, Nanggan, ate it. Due to the effects of the mermaid, she maintained the beauty of a 20-year-old forever and did not age. The men around her were fearful of this, and she never married. Her parents died when she was 50.

At the age of 101, she left Pyongyang on a long journey in search of marriage and children. During her 100-year journey, she had sexual intercourse with many men, but could not conceive. Finally giving up, she returned to Pyongyang, built a hermitage at Morandae, erected a prayer tower, and prayed to the Buddha for the blessing of children. She continued to have sexual intercourse with men, but even after trying hard for 100 years, she could not have children.

Finally, Nanggan climbed Moranbong and was never seen again. It is said she was 300 years old at this time.

== Analysis ==
One interpretation of the legend is that Nanggan was given unwanted eternal youth and longevity as a punishment for stealing and eating a special item from the Dragon Palace, rather than having desired it herself.

Research suggests a connection to the Japanese Yaobikuni legend, as they share common motifs (a special object brought from the otherworld, the daughter stealing and eating it, the daughter's eternal youth and long journey, and the daughter disappearing into the otherworld).
