= Yanggakdo =

Island in Pyongyang

Coordinates: 38°59′56.16″N 125°45′4.15″E

A 1946 map of Pyongyang by the U.S. Army Map Service, showing Yanggak Island and Yanggak Bridge

Yanggakdo, or Yanggak Island is a small island in the Taedong River, located about two kilometers to the south-east of the centre of the North Korean capital city Pyongyang. It is connected to the northern and southern side of Pyongyang by the Yanggak Bridge, which spans the island and separates it into a northeastern and southwestern part. The name means "Rams horn island" and is said to be derived from its shape.

On its northeastern end is the 170-metre (560 ft) tall Yanggakdo International Hotel, the second tallest building in North Korea. Adjacent to the hotel's southern side, there was originally a 9,000 square metre nine-hole golf course which as of 2011 had been demolished to make space for a new Chinese-funded health complex to be built.

Also on the northeastern part of Yanggak Island, the Pyongyang International Cinema Hall can be found, which hosts the opening and closing ceremonies of the Pyongyang International Film Festival.

The island's southwestern part houses the Yanggakdo Stadium, which is a multi-purpose stadium that holds 30,000 people and was opened in 1989.

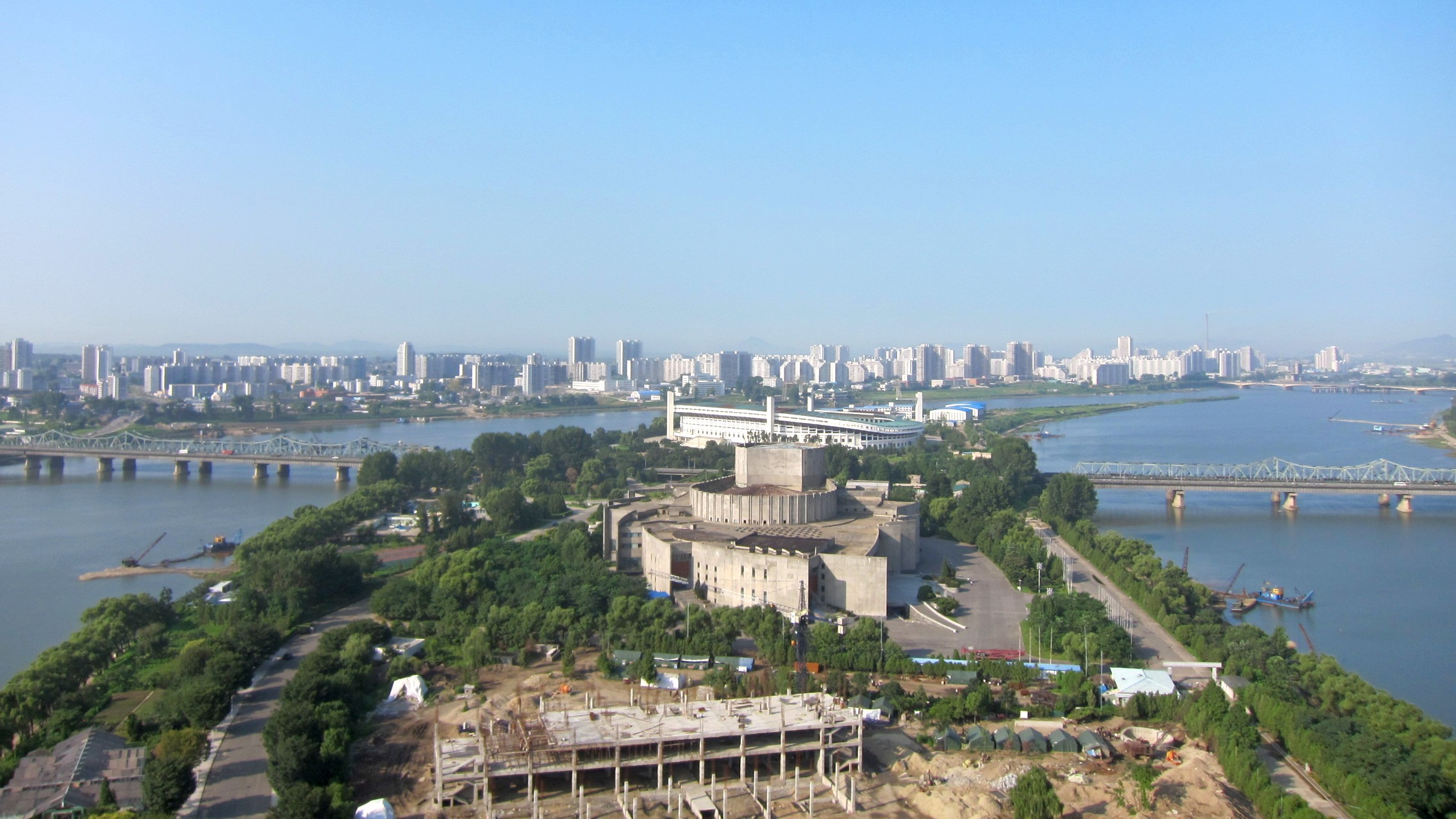
Yanggak Island in August 2012; from front to rear: new health complex's construction site, International Cinema Hall, Yanggak Bridge, and Yanggakdo Stadium

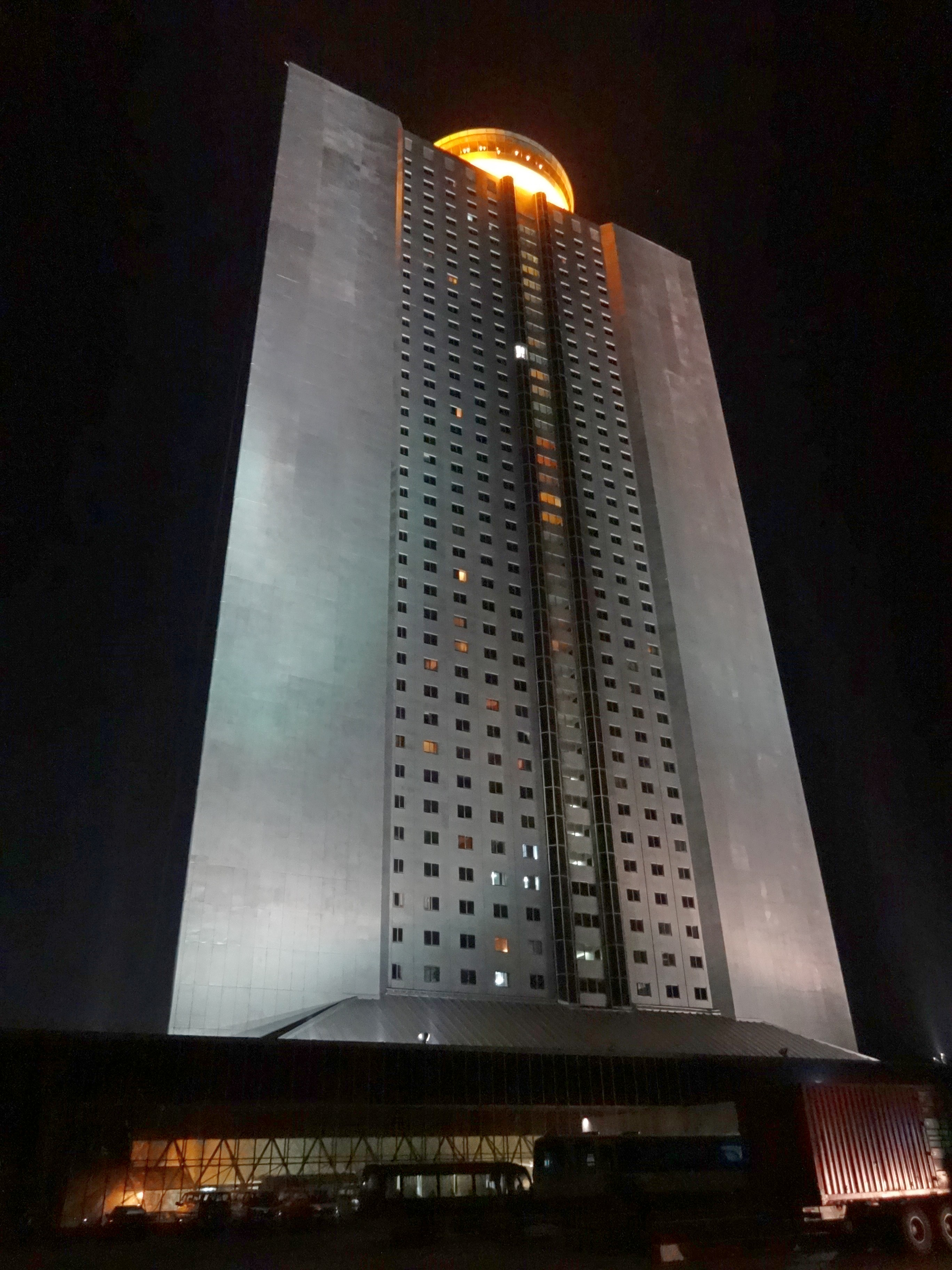
Front side of Yanggakdo International Hotel by night

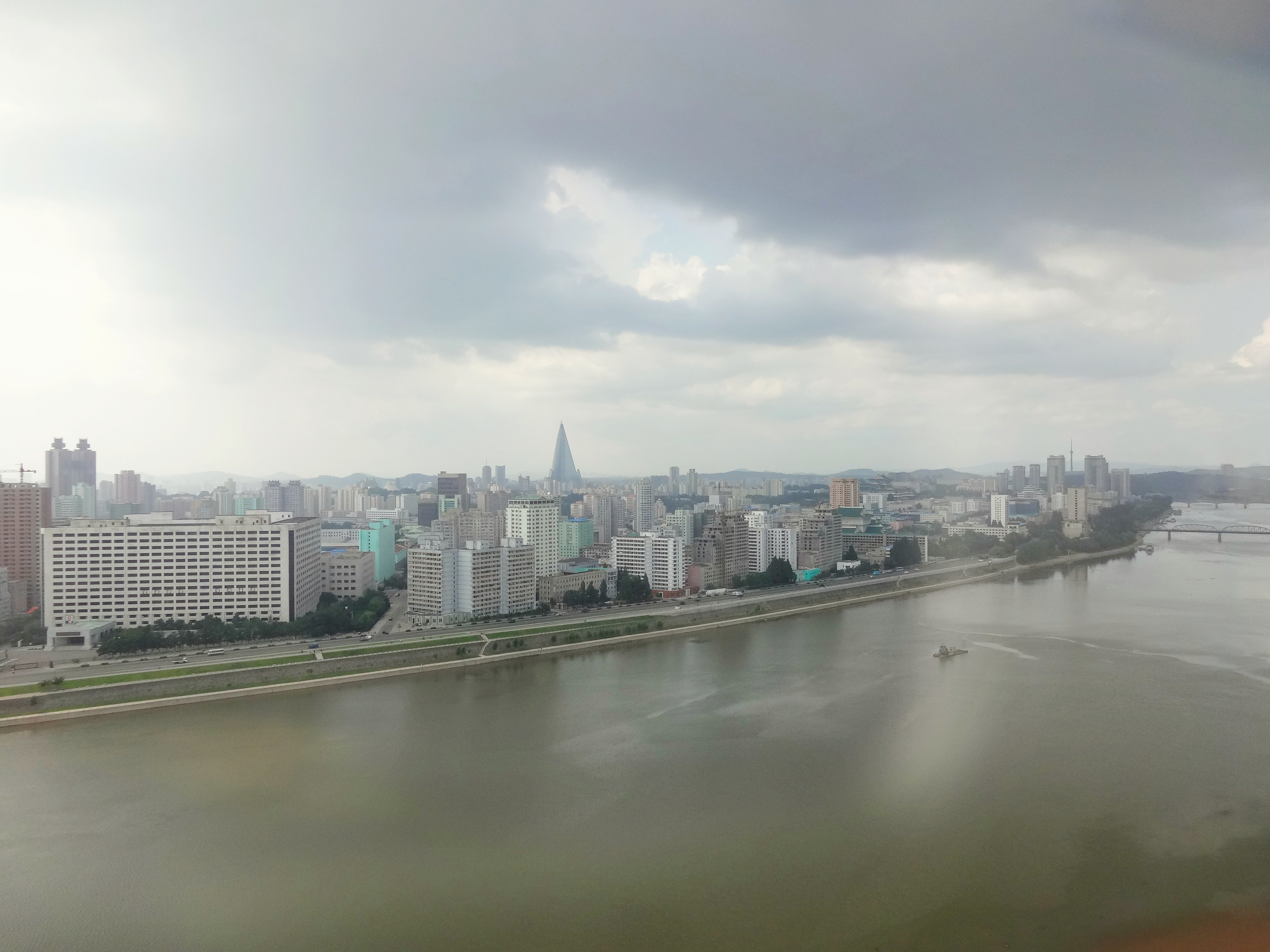
Pyongyang as seen from the hotel, looking in northern direction

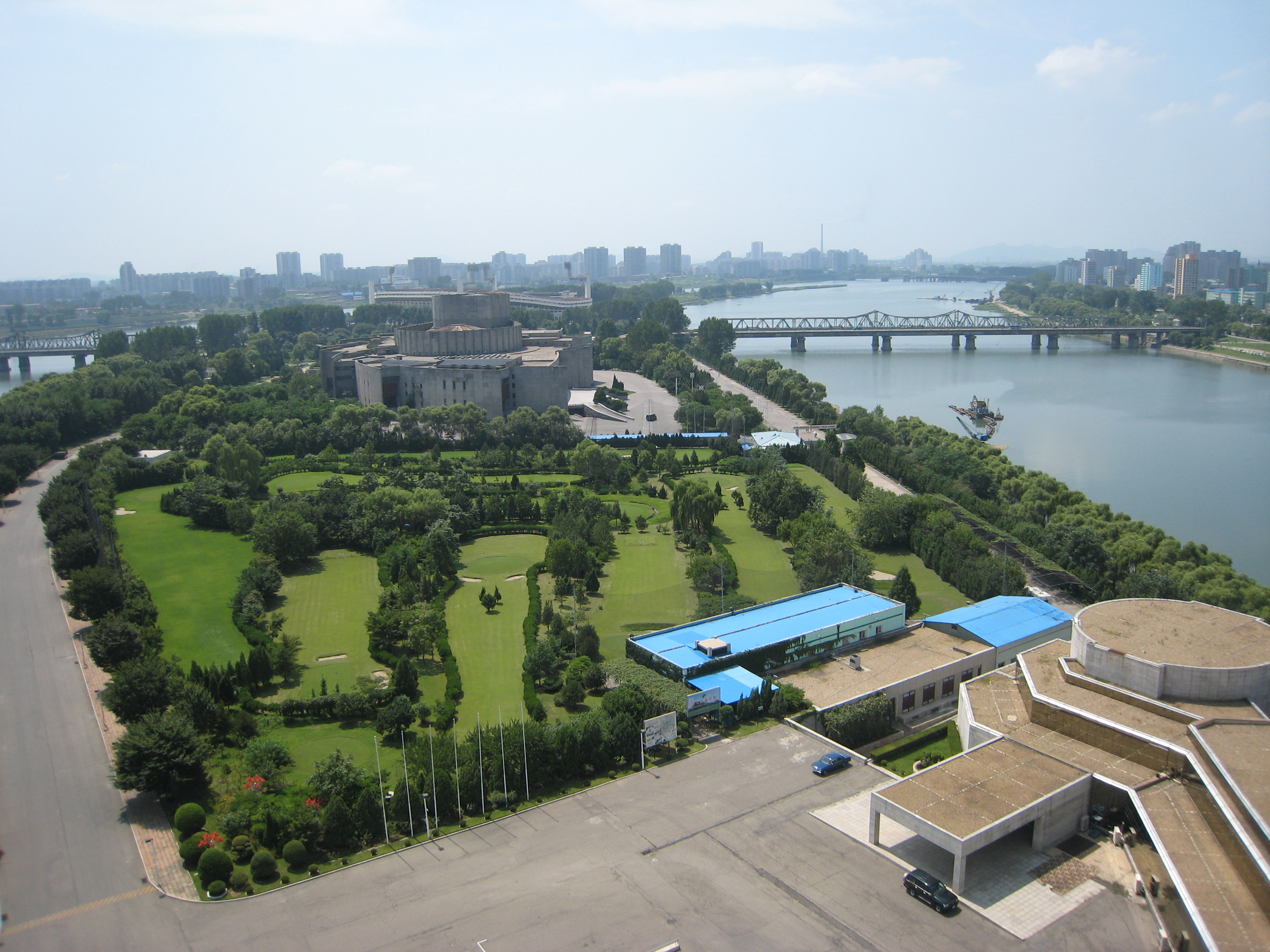
In August 2010 the golf course was still in use
