= Taedongmoon Cinema =

Movie theater in Pyongyang, North Korea

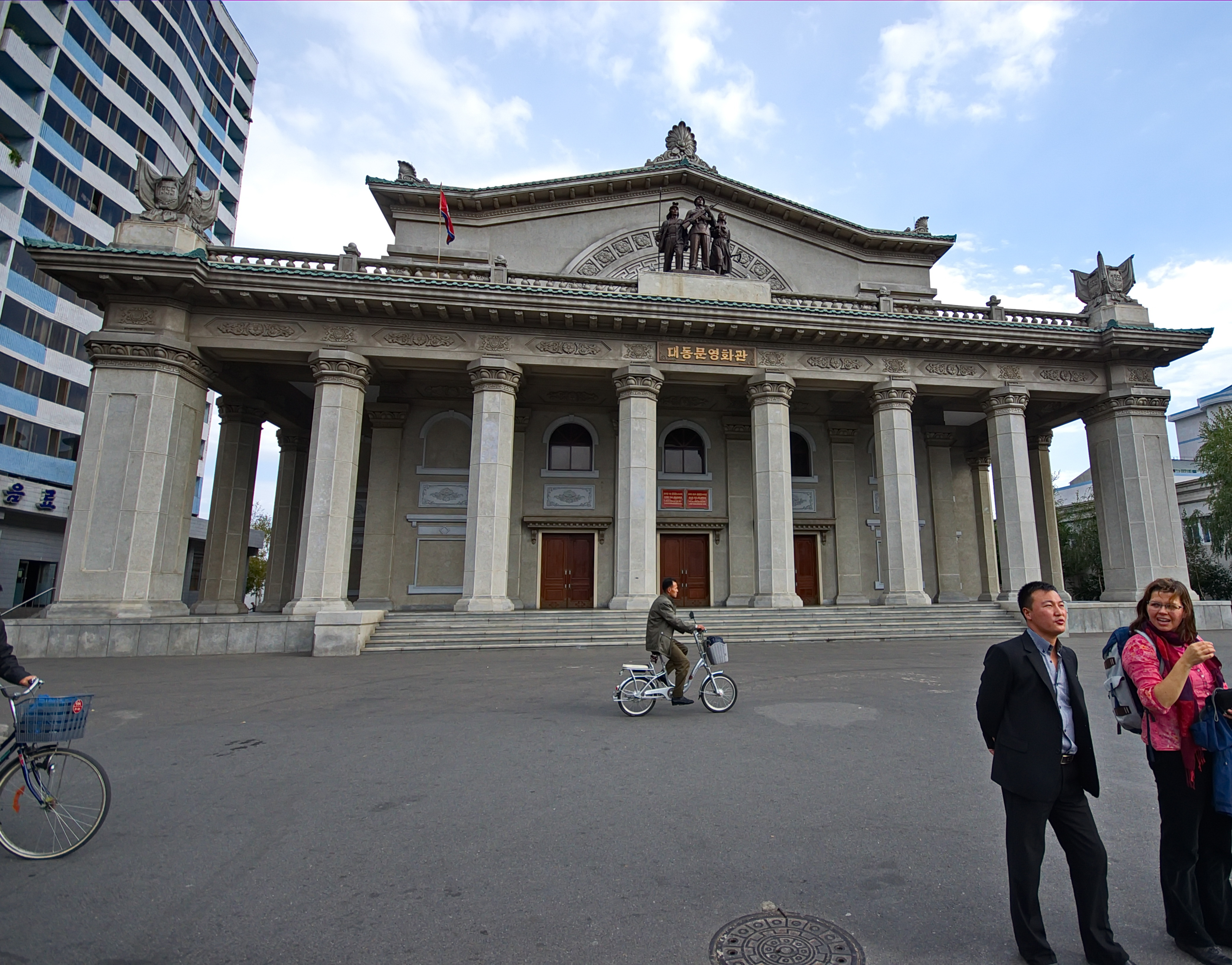
- Exterior of Taedongmoon Cinema

- Location within Pyongyang
- Location: Sungri Street, Chung-guyok, Pyongyang, North Korea
- Coordinates: 39.024643°N 125.756142°E
- Type: Movie theater
- Public transit: Ch?llima: S?ngni

Construction
- Built: 1955

Korean name
- Hangul: 대동문영화관
- Hanja: 大同門映畫館
- RR: Daedongmun yeonghwagwan
- MR: Taedongmun yŏnghwagwan

Taedongmoon Cinema (Korean: 대동문영화관) is a movie theater located in Sungri Street, Chung-guyok, Pyongyang, North Korea. The cinema is located near the Taedong River.

Taedongmoon Cinema was built in 1955. Its facade is lined with Greek-style columns inspired by classical architecture. Originally it had only a single screen, but since renovations to the interior in 2008, there have been two. It is considered the most important cinema of Pyongyang and serves as the flagship cinema for domestic film screenings. Occasionally, when foreign films are screened, the screening is for an invited audience only with no access by the general public. It is also used for screenings of the Pyongyang International Film Festival.

== See also ==
- Cinema of North Korea
- International Cinema Hall
- Taedongmun
