= Kalma Theatre =

Theatre in North Korea

The Kalma Theatre (Korean: 갈마극장) is a theatre located in North Korea.

== See also ==
- List of theatres in North Korea
