= Yanggak Bridge =

Coordinates: 38.9938°N 125.7456°E

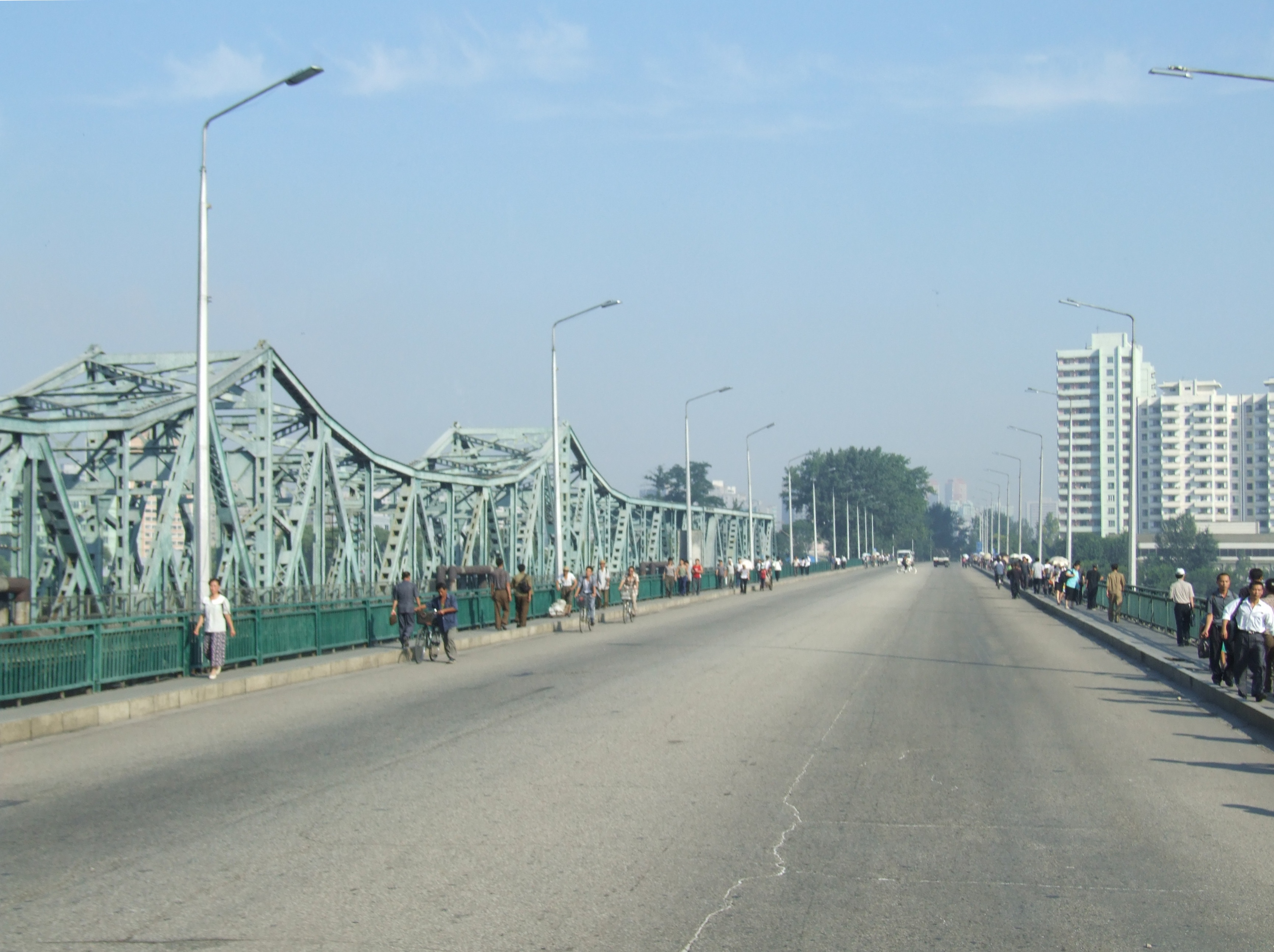
Yanggak Bridge

Yanggak Bridge (양각교) is the second (west–east) of the six major bridges on the Taedong River in Pyongyang. The middle of the bridge has an off-ramp to Yanggak Island.
