= List of theatres in North Korea =

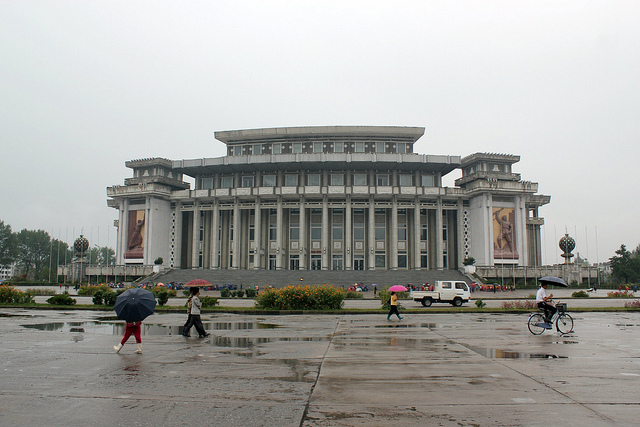
Hamhŭng Grand Theatre.

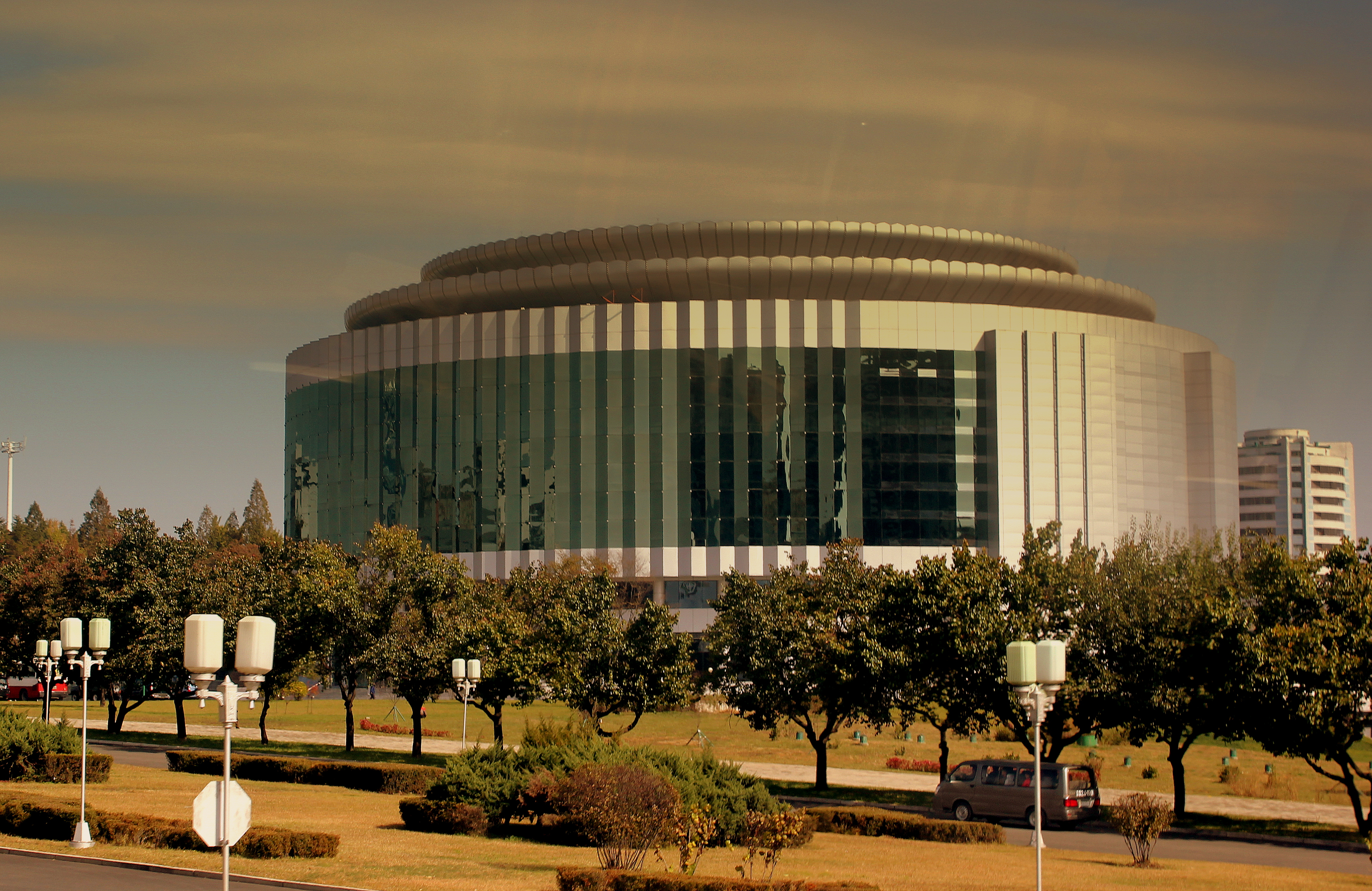
Mansudae People's Theatre, opened in 2012

This is a list of theaters in North Korea.

- April 25 House of Culture
- Central Youth Hall
- East Pyongyang Grand Theatre
- Hamhung Grand Theatre
- International Cinema Hall
- Kalma Theatre
- Mansudae Art Theatre
- Mansudae People's Theatre
- Moranbong Theatre
- People's Palace of Culture
- Ponghwa Art Theatre
- Pyongyang Circus
- Pyongyang Grand Theatre
- Pyongyang Puppet Theatre (formerly State Arts Theatre, originally Pyongyang Public Hall)
- Pyongyang Moranbong Circus
- Taedongmoon Cinema
