= Pyongyang Ice Rink =

Indoor ice honkey venue

- 평양빙상관
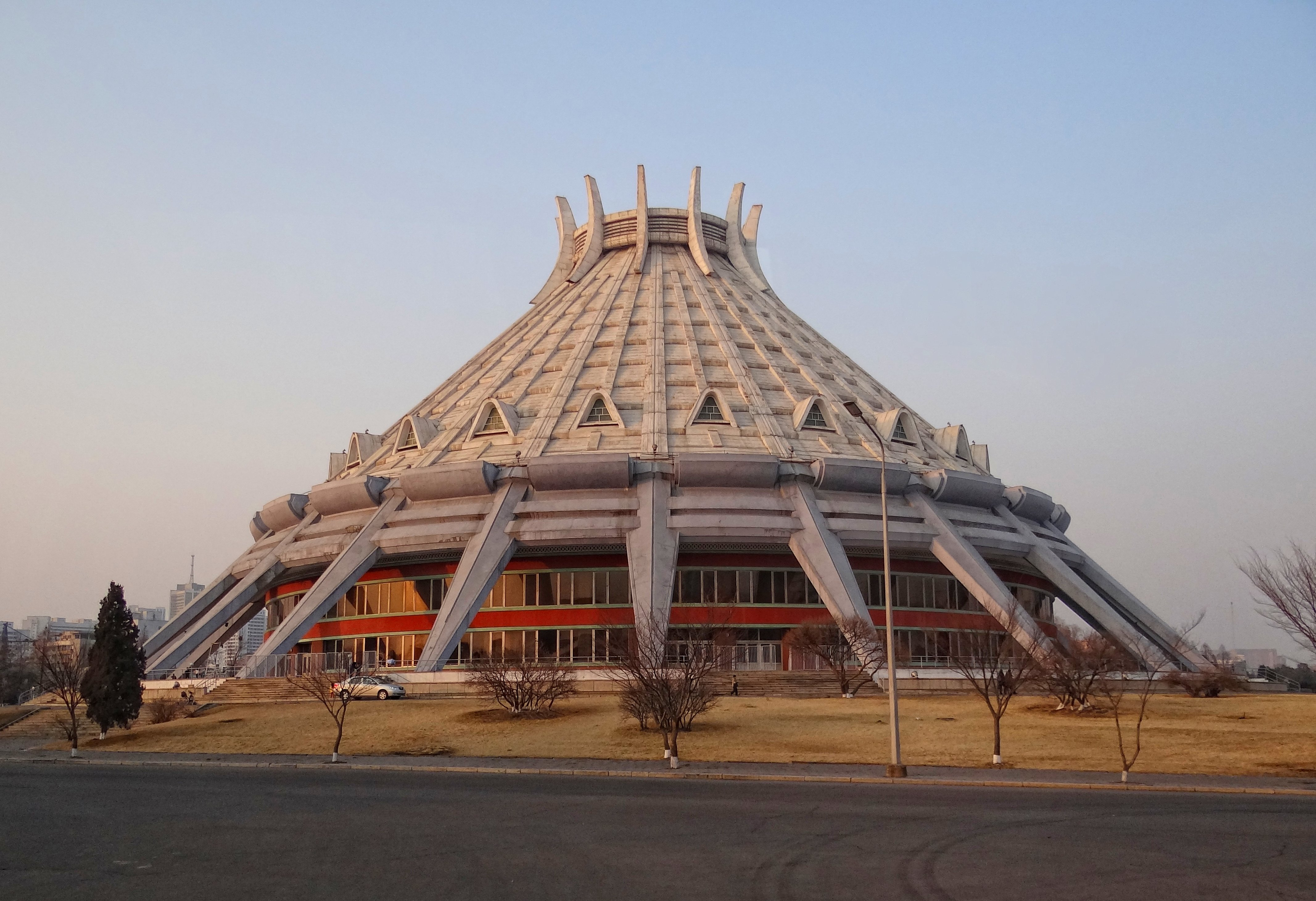
- Pyongyang Ice Rink photographed during sunset in March 2014.
- Interactive map of Pyongyang Ice Rink
- Location: Pyongyang, North Korea
- Coordinates: 39.022778°N 125.730833°E
- Capacity: 6000
- Public transit: Hwanggumbol Station

Construction
- Groundbreaking: June 1980
- Opened: 1982

The Pyongyang Ice Rink (Korean: 평양빙상관; Hanja: 平壤氷上館) is an indoor ice hockey venue on the bank of Pothong River in Pyongyang, North Korea. The Pyongyang Peoples Outdoor Ice Rink is a recent construction.

== History ==
The arena was built in 1982. It has 6,000 seats, making it the biggest indoor ice rink in North Korea. It is mainly used for ice hockey, figure skating and speed skating, however other sports such as table tennis, basketball, and volleyball have also been played at the venue.

The Paektusan Prize International Figure Skating Festival was held here every February. In March 2007, the IIHF Women's World Championship Division II was held at the arena. The design of the Ice Rink is very similar to the Cathedral of Brasília.

== Gallery ==
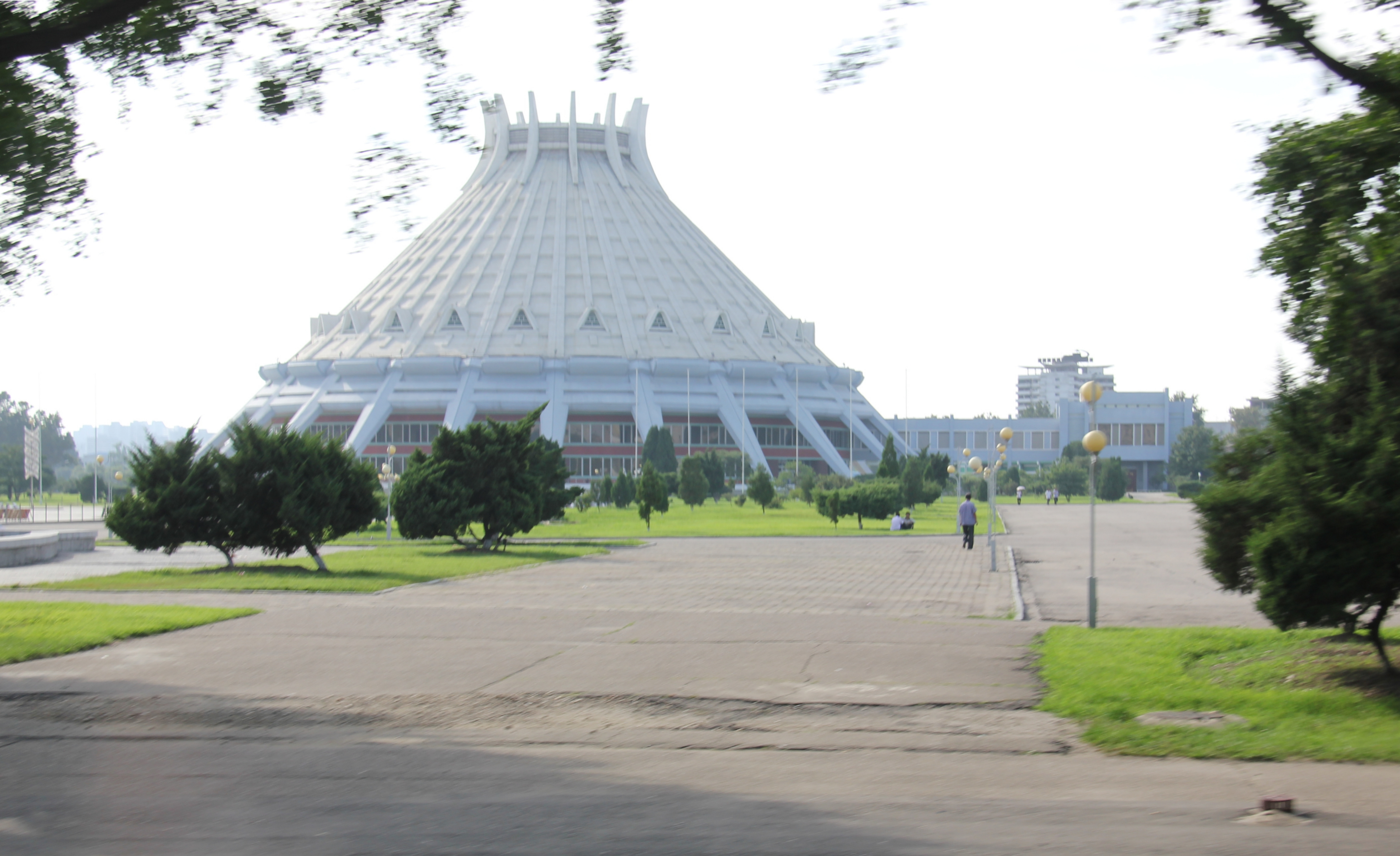

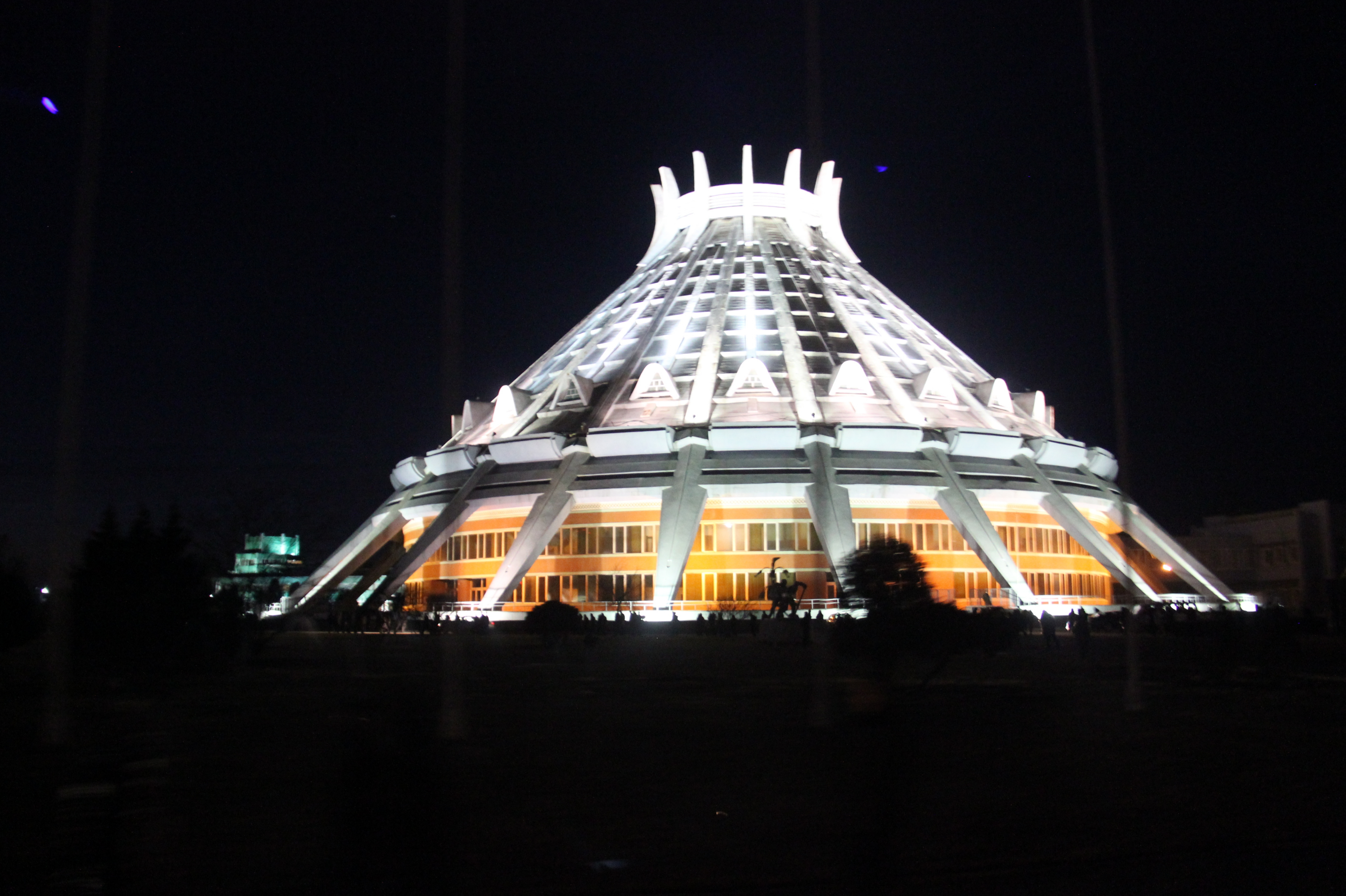

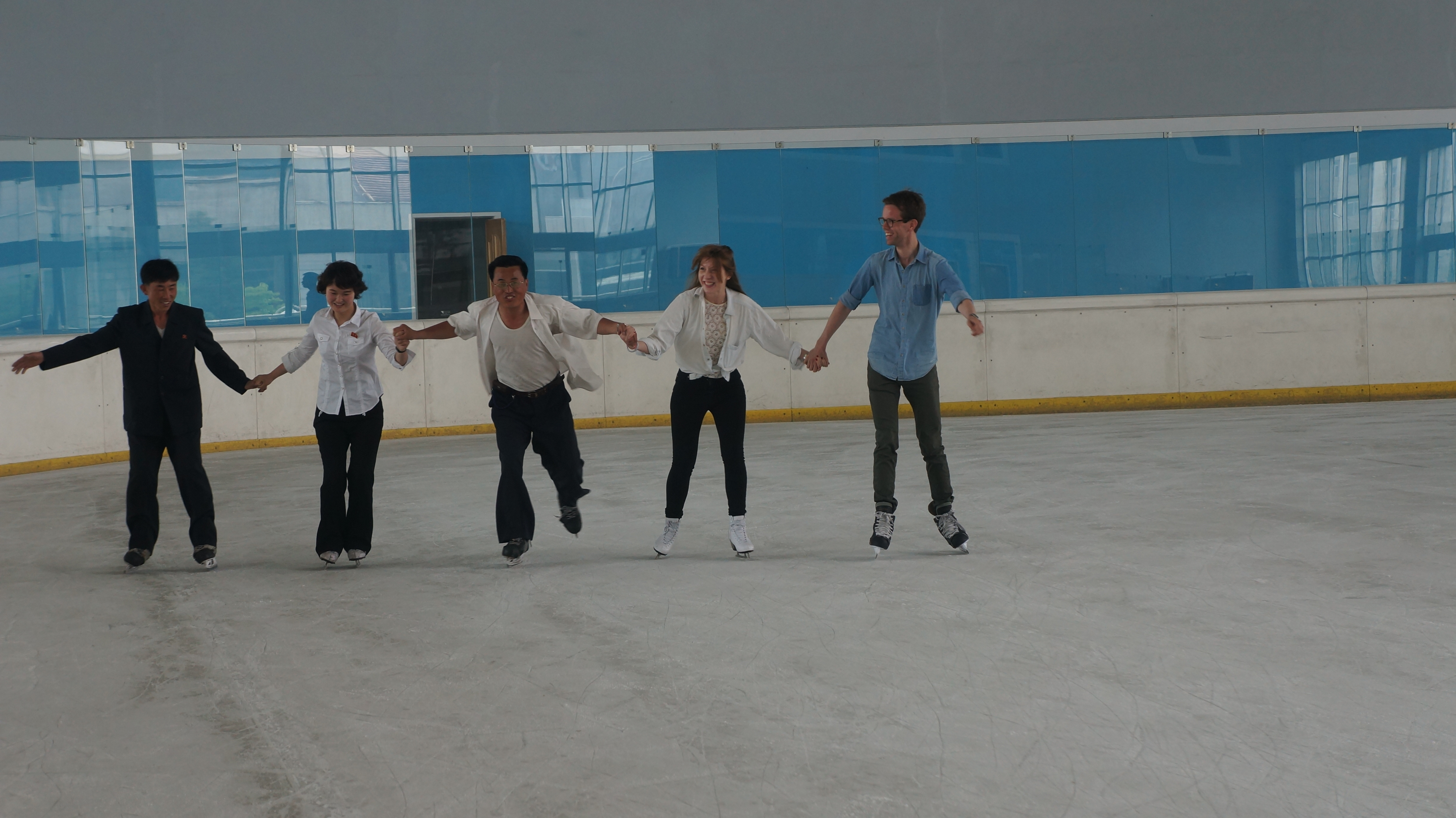

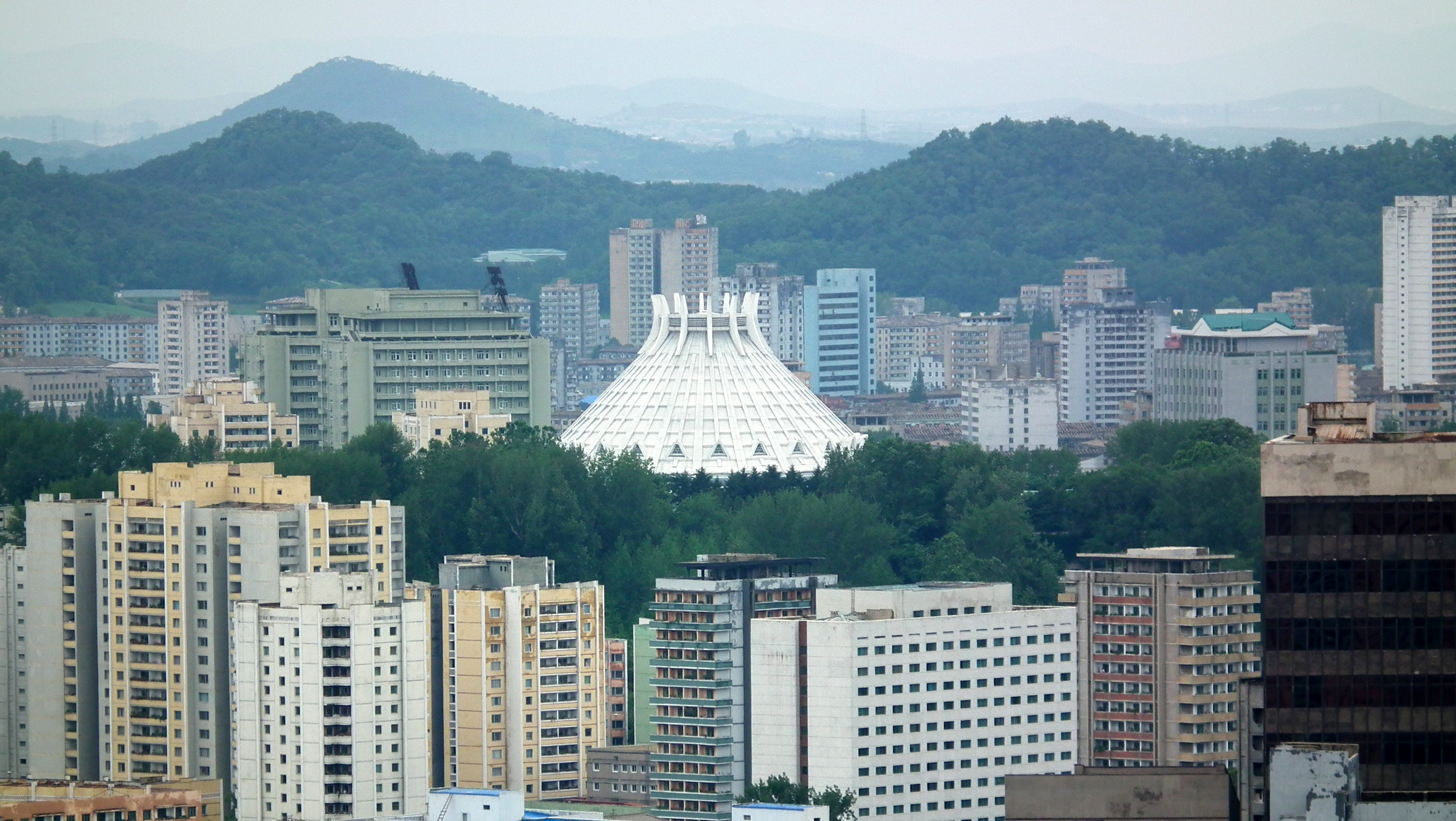
