= Ponghwa Art Theatre =

Theater in Pyongyang, North Korea

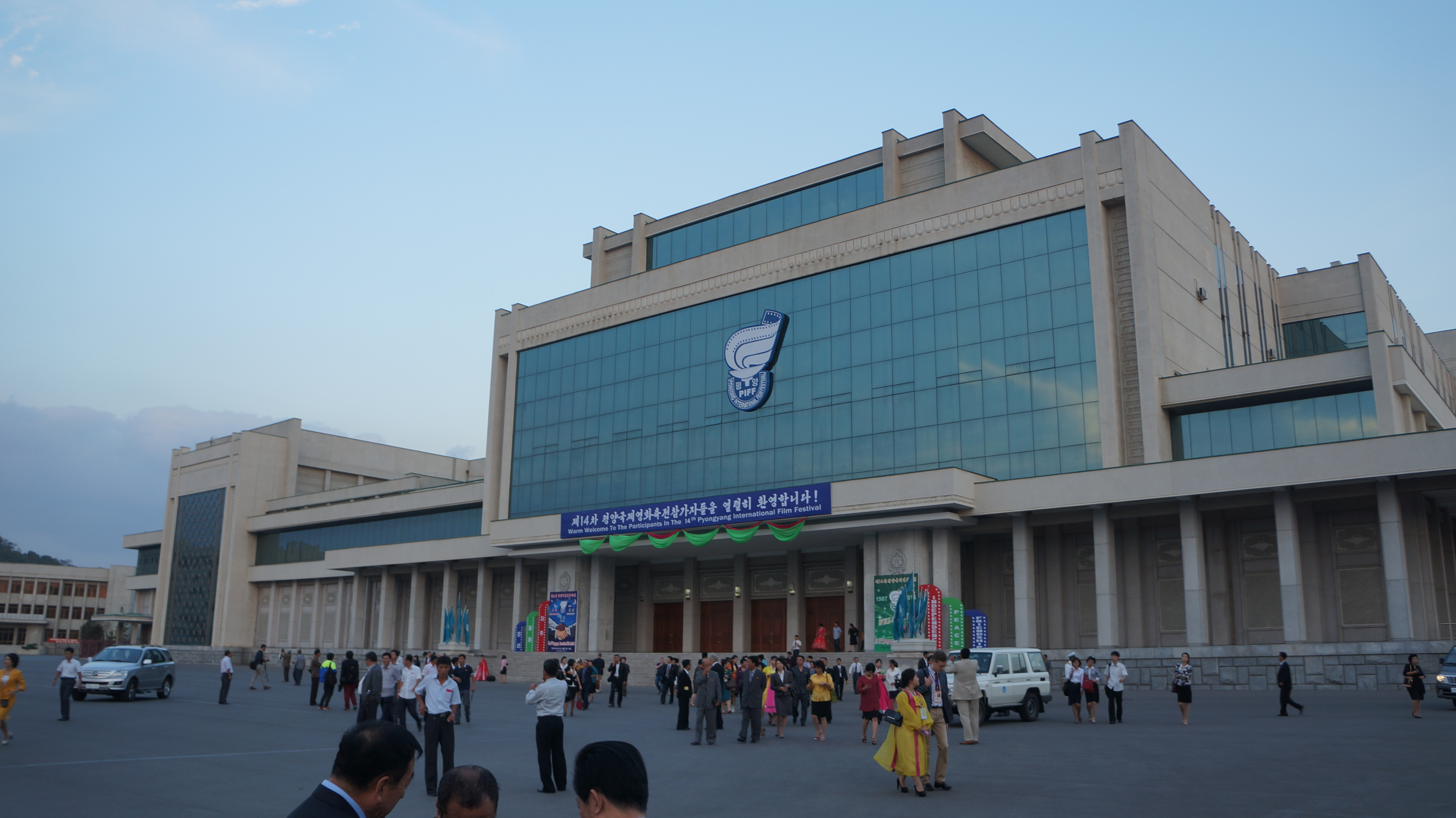
Ponghwa Art Theatre

The Ponghwa Art Theatre (Korean: 봉화예술극장) is a theatre located in Pyongyang, North Korea.

== See also ==
- List of theatres in North Korea
