= Arch of Triumph (Pyongyang) =

Monument in Pyongyang, North Korea

Coordinates: 39°2′40″N 125°45′10″E

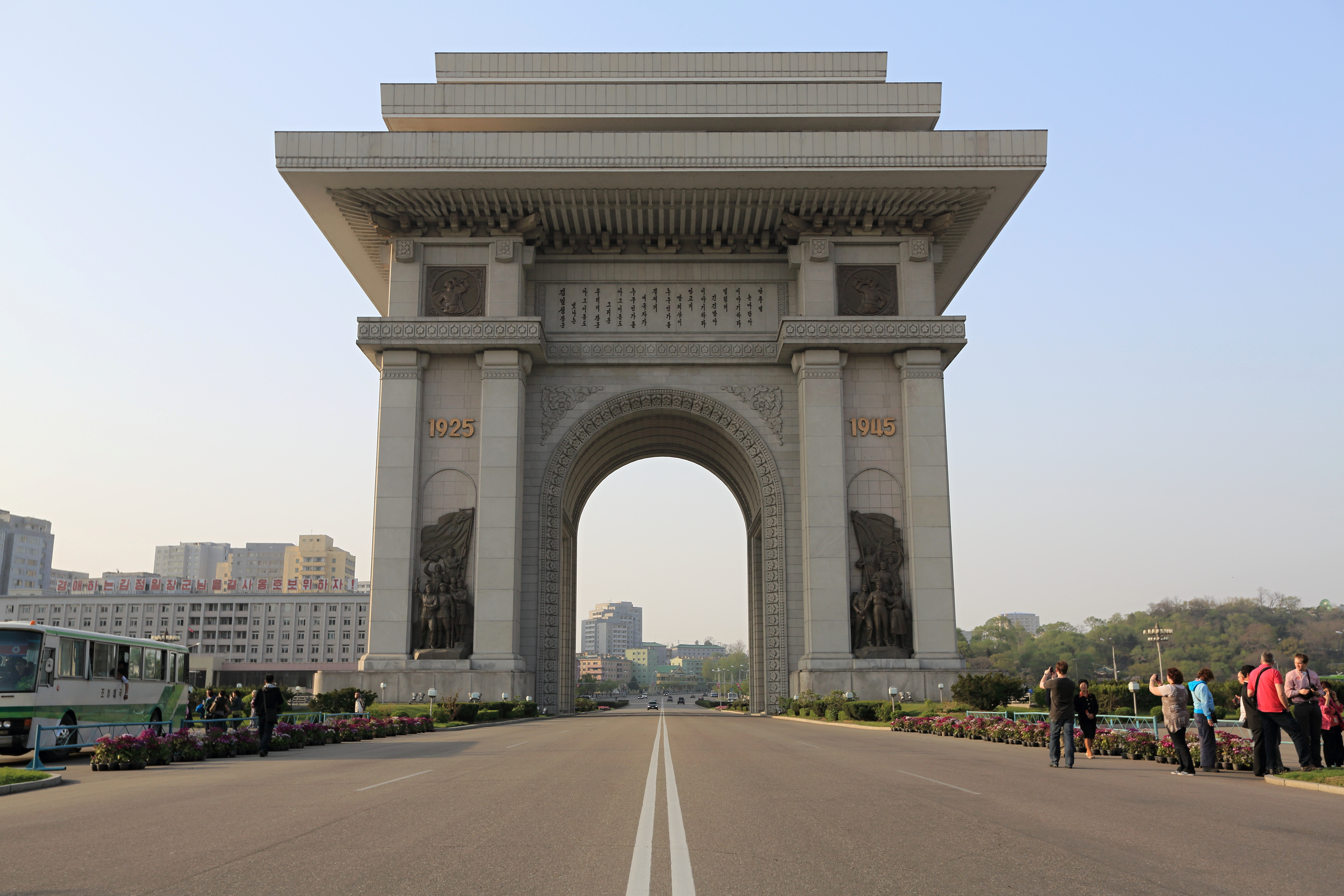
- Interactive map of Arch of Triumph
- Location: Pyongyang, North Korea
- Material: White granite
- Width: 50 metres (160 ft)
- Height: 60 metres (200 ft)
- Opening date: April 15, 1982
- Dedicated to: Kim Il Sung's resistance to Japan

- Arch of Triumph
- Hangul: 개선문
- Hanja: 凱旋門
- RR: Gaeseonmun
- MR: Kaesŏnmun

The Arch of Triumph (Korean: 개선문; Hanja: 凱旋門) is a triumphal arch in Pyongyang, North Korea. It was built to commemorate the Korean resistance to Japan from 1925 to 1945. It is the second tallest memorial arch in the world, after Monumento a la Revolución in Mexico, standing 60 m (197 ft) high and 50 m (164 ft) wide.

Built in 1982 on the Triumph Return Square at the foot of Moran Hill (모란봉) in the North Korean capital city of Pyongyang, the monument was built to honour Kim Il Sung's role in the military resistance for Korean independence. Inaugurated on the occasion of his 70th birthday, each of its 25,500 blocks of finely-dressed white granite represents a day of his life up to that point.

== Design ==
The structure is modeled after the Arc de Triomphe in Paris, but is 10 metres (33 ft) taller. The arch has dozens of rooms, balustrades, observation platforms and elevators. It also has four vaulted gateways, each 27 m (89 ft) high, decorated with azalea carved in their girth. Inscribed in the arch is the revolutionary hymn "Song of General Kim Il Sung", and the year 1925, when North Korean history states that Kim set out on the journey for national liberation of the country from Japanese rule. Also depicted on the arch is the year 1945, when Korea was liberated.

== See also ==
- Korean architecture
- Tourism in North Korea
- Juche Tower
- Kaeson Revolutionary Site
- Monument to Party Founding
- Memorial gates and arches
