= Central Youth Hall =

Building in Pyongyang, North Korea

Coordinates: 39°01′37″N 125°46′08″E

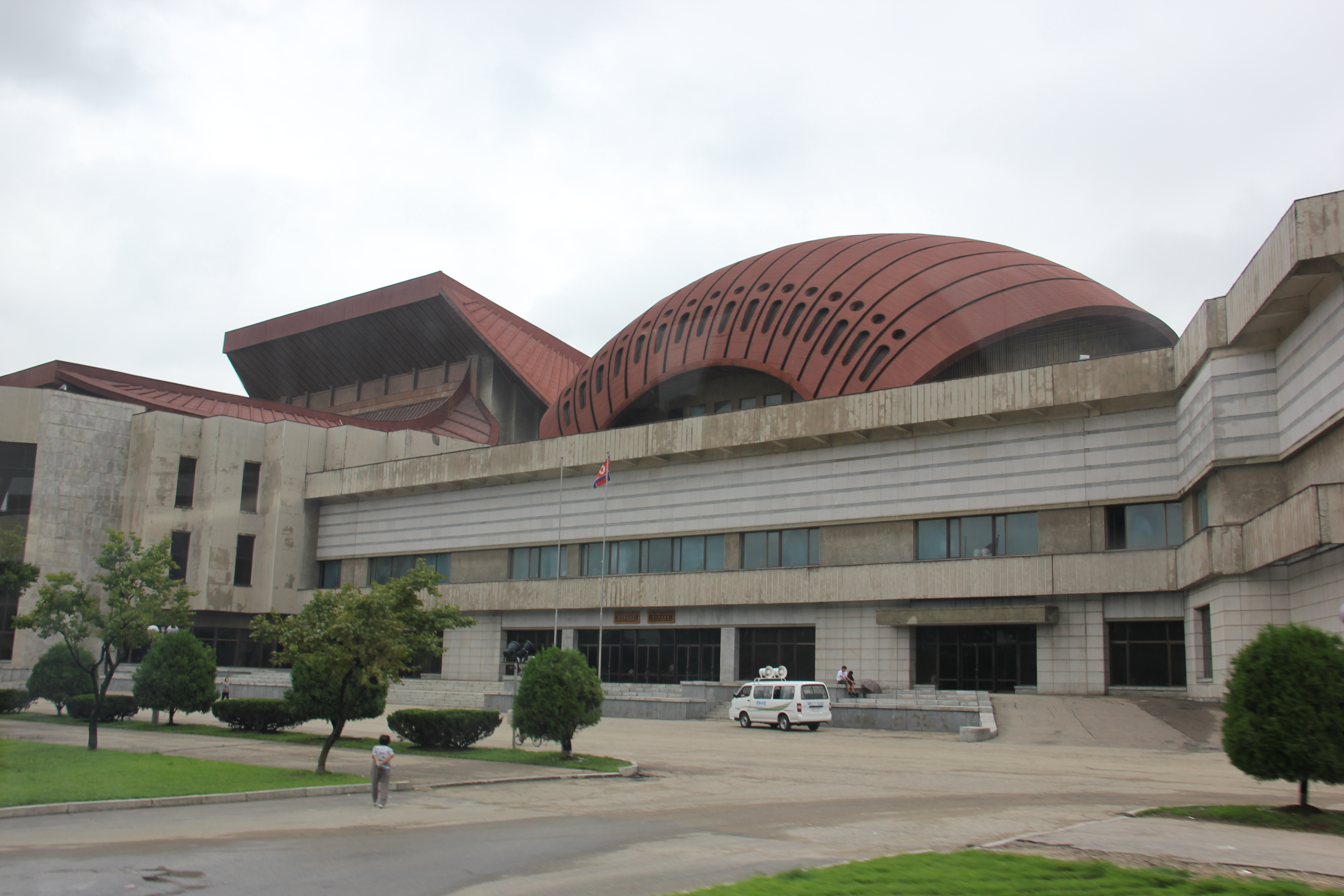
Central Youth Hall

The Central Youth Hall (Korean: 청년중앙회관) is a social education center located in Pyongyang, North Korea. It opened on 18 May 1989 for the 13th World Festival of Youth and Students. The building houses a variety of functions including two theatres (2,000 and 600 seats), a multipurpose hall for 1,000, four large meeting rooms for 250 people; in total a total of 760 rooms covering 59,900 sq m.

== History ==
The hall is a regular venue for meetings and performances organised by the Kim Il Sung Socialist Youth League, North Korea's main youth organisation. Reports by the state news agency KCNA and by analysts record a range of such events. On 18 April 2004, a national meeting was held there to mark the 30th anniversary of Kim Jong Il's instruction on intensifying after-school sports activities. Kim Kyong Ho, first secretary of the youth league's Central Committee, gave the report. Those present included Workers' Party Central Committee secretary Kim Jung Rin, Education Minister Kim Yong Jin and Mun Jae Dok, chairman of the Physical Culture and Sports Guidance Commission.

In December 2012, a remembrance meeting of youth and students titled "The General and Youth" was held at the hall for the first anniversary of Kim Jong Il's death. On 12 February 2016, during the events marking Kim Jong Il's birth anniversary, the Kim Il Sung Youth League Art Propaganda Squad performed a concert at the hall. The programme included the songs "General Star" and "We Will Go to Mt. Paektu".

== See also ==
- List of theatres in North Korea
