= Moranbong Theatre =

Theatre in Pyongyang, North Korea

Coordinates: 39.0357°N 125.7551°E

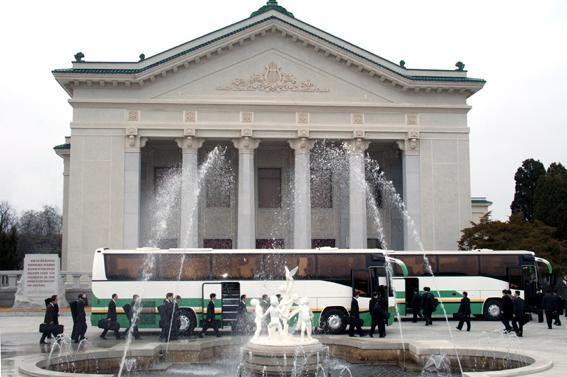
Moranbong Theatre

The Moranbong Theatre (Korean: 모란봉극장; Hanja: 牡丹峰劇場) is a theatre located in Moranbong, Pyongyang, North Korea. It was opened in 1946 and renovated in 2006.

== See also ==
- List of theatres in North Korea
- State Symphony Orchestra of the Democratic People's Republic of Korea
