= Mansudae People's Theatre =

Theatre in Pyongyang, North Korea

- 평양인민극장
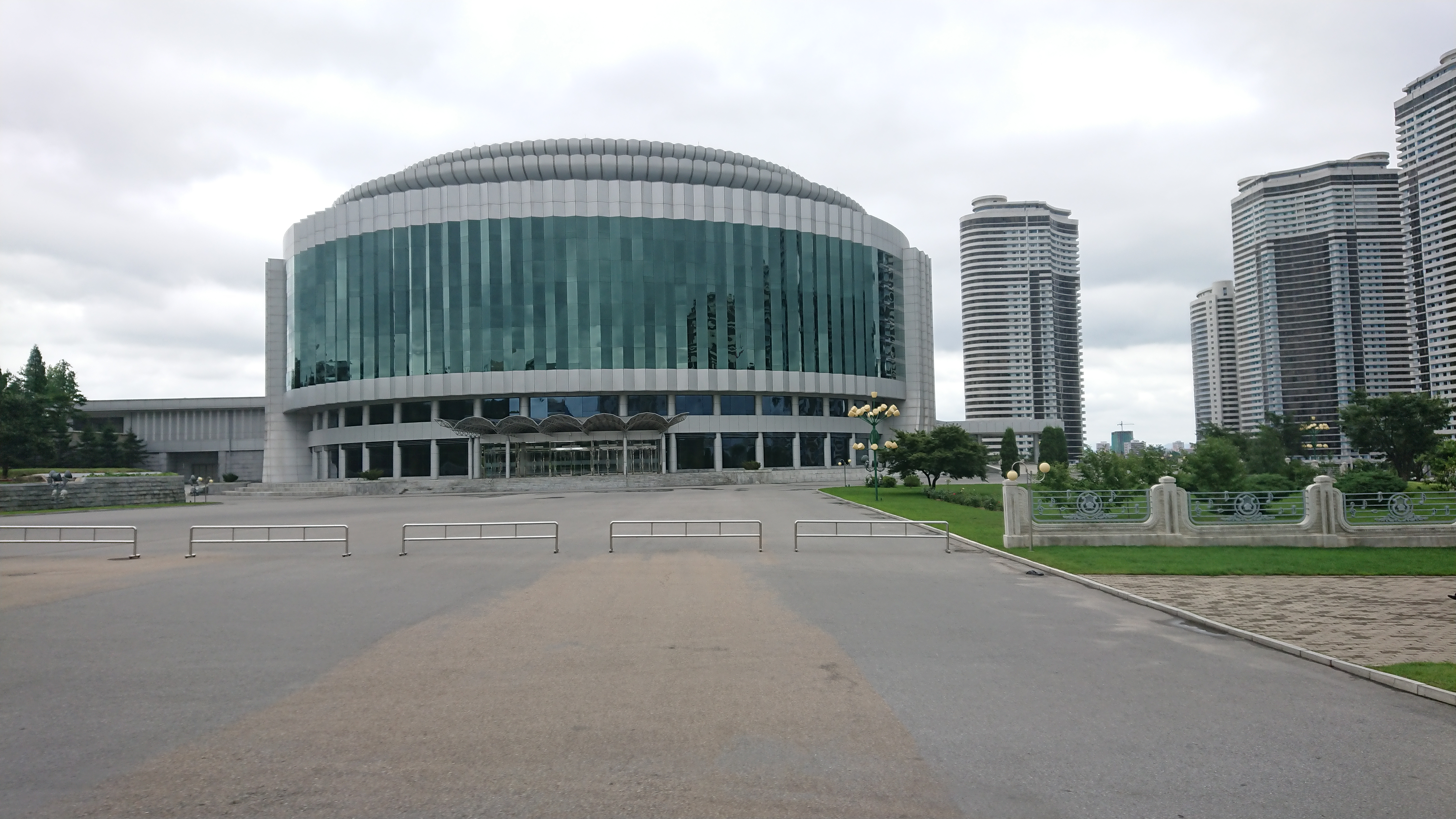
- Interactive map of Mansudae People's Theatre
- Coordinates: 39.0287916°N 125.7553262°E
- Public transit: ■ Chollima: T'ongil

Construction
- Opened: 2012

The Mansudae People's Theatre (Korean: 인민극장; Hanja: 人民劇場) is a theatre near to the Mansudae Assembly Hall in Pyongyang, North Korea. It was opened in 2012.

== See also ==
- List of theatres in North Korea
- Mansudae Art Studio
