= Pyongyang Peoples Outdoor Ice Rink =

Ice rink in Pyongyang, North Korea

The Pyongyang Peoples Outdoor Ice Rink (인민야외빙상장) is a new ice rink in Pyongyang. Despite the official name, the building is covered. It is larger than the 1982 Pyongyang Ice Rink (평양빙상관) on the bank of Pothonggang Canal.
