= East Pyongyang Grand Theatre =

North Korean musical venue

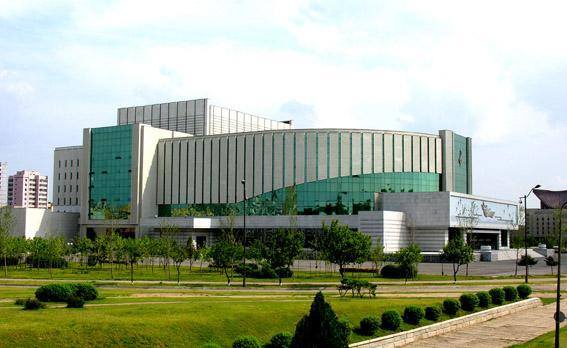
- The Theatre building seen from the side

- Location within Pyongyang
- Location: Pyongyang, North Korea
- Coordinates: 39°01′52″N 125°46′13″E
- Capacity: 2,500
- Surface: 62,000 m^{2} (670,000 sq ft)

Construction
- Built: 1989

- East Pyongyang Grand Theatre
- Hangul: 동평양대극장
- Hanja: 東平壤大劇場
- RR: Dongpyeongyang daegeukjang
- MR: Tongp'yŏngyang taegŭkchang

The East Pyongyang Grand Theatre (Korean: 동평양대극장) is a 2,500-seat theatre located in the North Korean capital, Pyongyang. It was the site of the 2008 concert by the New York Philharmonic, which was the first significant cultural visit to North Korea by the United States since the Korean War.

The hall was built in 1989 and is normally a venue for performances that celebrate North Korea's dynastic leaders and national achievements. The December before the concert, it had hosted an opera honoring Kim Jong-suk, the mother of North Korean leader Kim Jong-il.

In 2005, the theatre suffered a fire that resulted in the loss of its original facade and interior elements.

On New Year's Day 2007, following reconstruction, the theatre hosted the Mansudae Art Troupe. Its "massive" stage needed an acoustic shell built to properly project the orchestra's sound. The theatre was specifically chosen by Zarin Mehta, who rejected the home of the North Korea State Symphony as too small.

The overall size is more than 62,000 square meters. A colonnaded great hall (lobby) includes a mural of Ulrim Falls. According to a Reuters journalist, its architecture is "bland communist", and a "hulking, ramshackle structure the locals struggle to keep heated and lit at night."

== Gallery ==
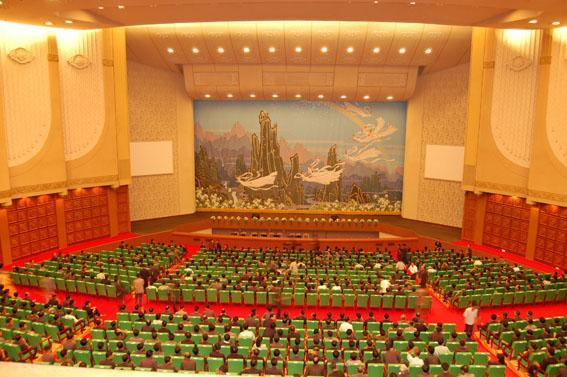
Auditorium of the Grand Theatre, 2006

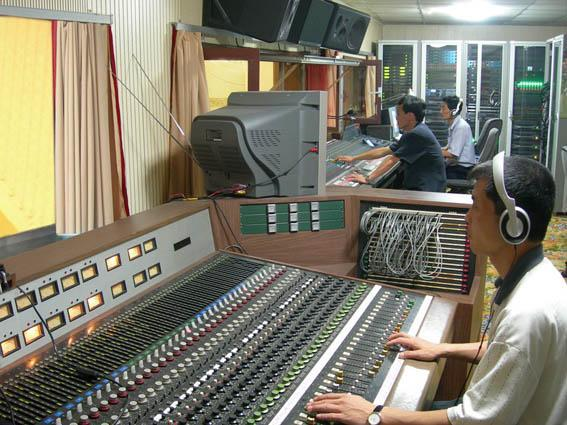
Staff in the audio monitoring room, 2006

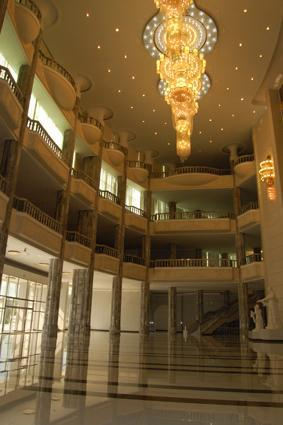
Lobby and chandeliers, 2006

== See also ==
- List of theatres in North Korea
