= Pyongyang Circus =

Multi-purpose building in Pyongyang, North Korea

Coordinates: 39°01′41″N 125°41′10″E

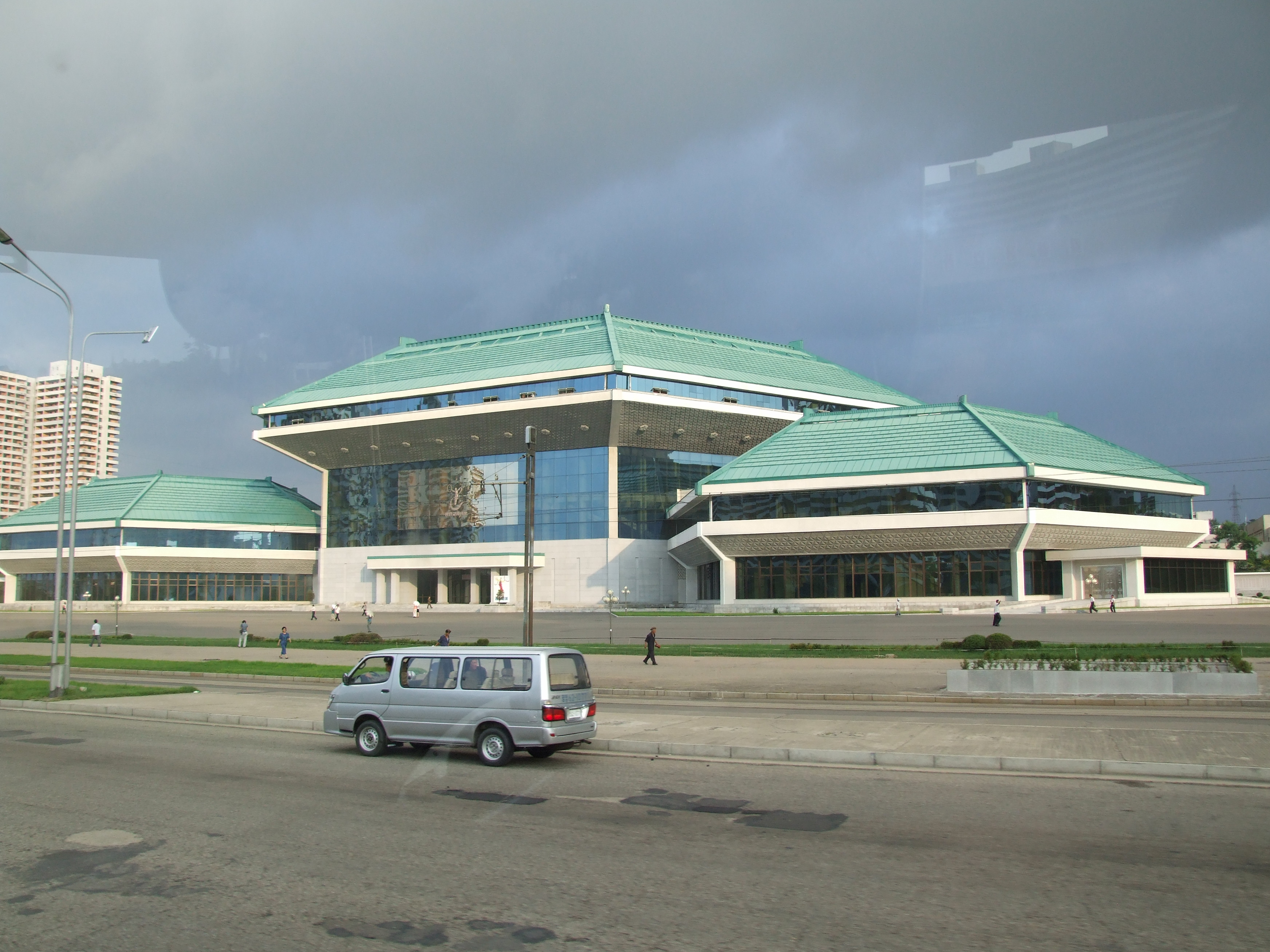

Origin
- Country: North Korea
- Year founded: 1989

The Pyongyang Circus is a multi-function building located in Pyongyang, North Korea. It was completed in 1989.

The circus has a floor space of 54,000 m^{2}. There are facilities for acrobatics, synchronized swimming, stunts on ice, clowns, and animal performances. It is also one of the theatres used for the April Spring Friendship Arts Festival. The Pyongyang Circus was renovated in 2012.

The circus appears in the film Comrade Kim Goes Flying.

== See also ==
- Culture of North Korea
- List of theatres in North Korea
