= Mansudae Art Theatre =

Theatre in Pyongyang, North Korea

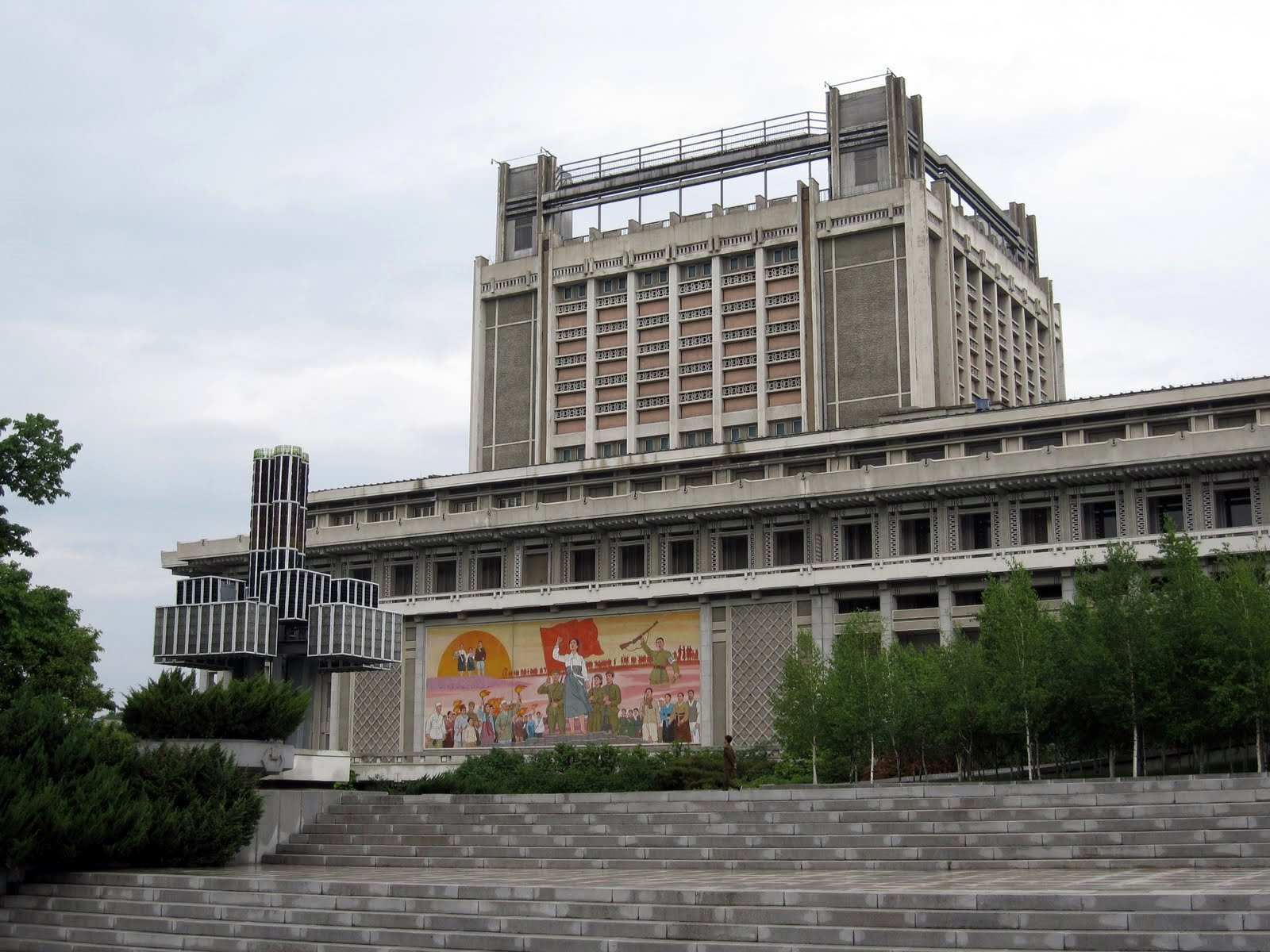

Korean name
- Hangul: 만수대예술극장
- Hanja: 萬壽臺藝術劇場
- RR: Mansudae yesul geukjang
- MR: Mansudae yesul kŭkchang

The Mansudae Art Theatre (Korean: 만수대예술극장) is a theatre located near the Grand People's Study House central library, in North Korea. It was completed in 1976.

It is used as a venue for the Samjiyon Band.

== See also ==
- List of theatres in North Korea
- Mansudae Art Studio
