= Moranbong =

Hilly park in Pyongyang, North Korea

Moranbong Park
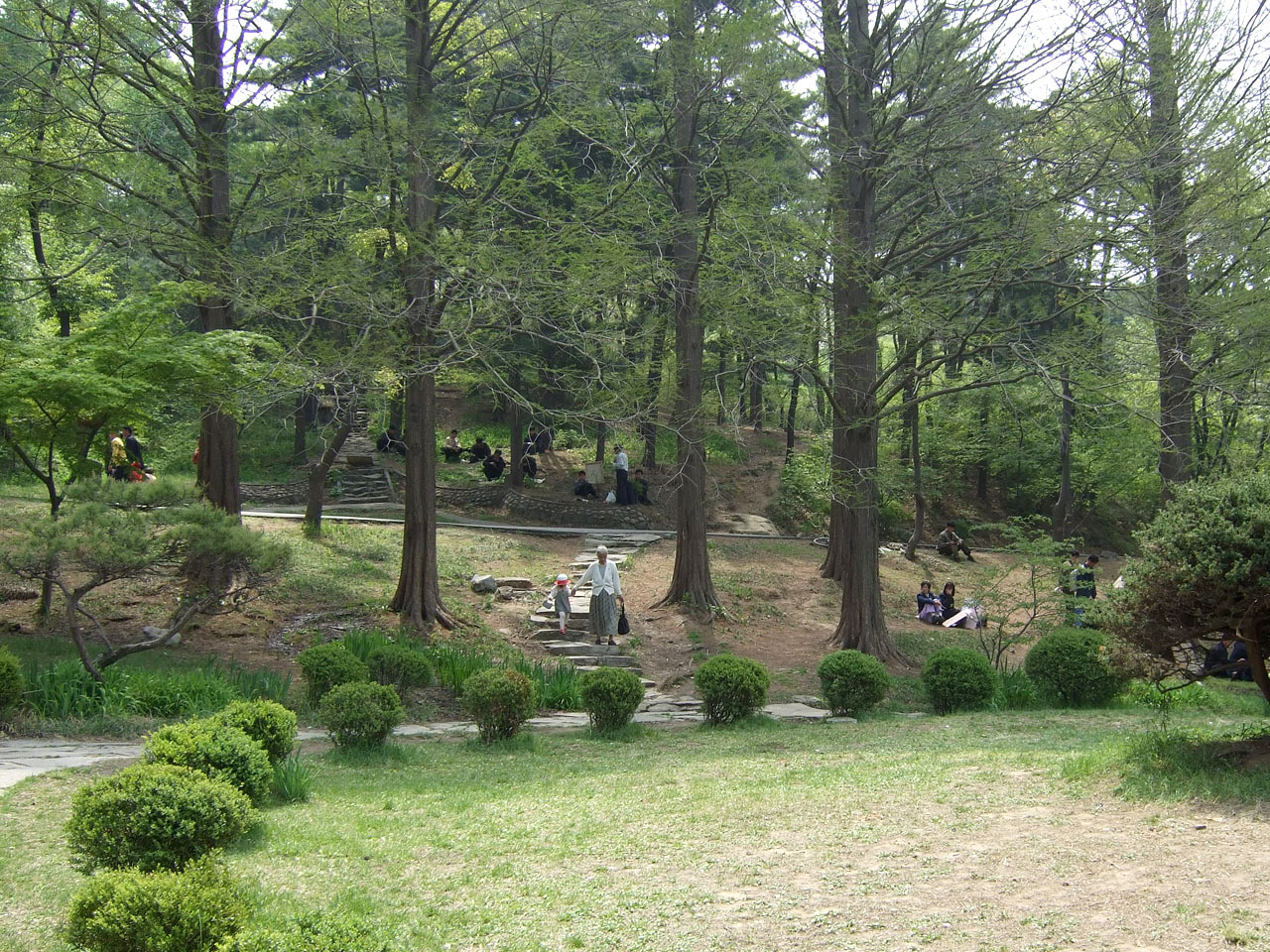
- Interactive map of Moranbong Park
- Coordinates: 39°02′25″N 125°45′30″E

Korean name
- Hangul: 모란봉
- Hanja: 牡丹峰
- RR: Moranbong
- MR: Moranbong

Moranbong (Korean: 모란봉; lit. 'Peony Hill; Peony Peak') or Moran Hill forms a park located in central Pyongyang, the capital of North Korea. Its 312-foot (95 m) summit is the location of the Pyongyang TV Tower.

There are multiple monumental structures located on Moran Hill. They include the Arch of Triumph, Kim Il-sung Stadium, and Kaeson Revolutionary Site. At the foot of the hill is the Jonsung Revolutionary Site, which conveys the "revolutionary achievements" of President Kim Il-sung and the Hungbu Revolutionary Site which is associated with the history of leader Kim Jong-il and includes trees bearing slogans written during the independence revolutionary struggle.

The area surrounding the hill is now a recreation area, including the Moranbong Theatre, the Kaeson Youth Park, an open-air theatre in the Youth Park, the Moranbong Hotel the Moran Restaurant, an afforestation exhibition and a small zoo. The Okryu Restaurant is also located nearby.

== See also ==
- Pyongyang Castle
- Moranbong Band
- Moranbong Sports Club
