= International Cinema Hall =

Cinema in Pyongyang, North Korea

Coordinates: 38.9956°N 125.7481°E

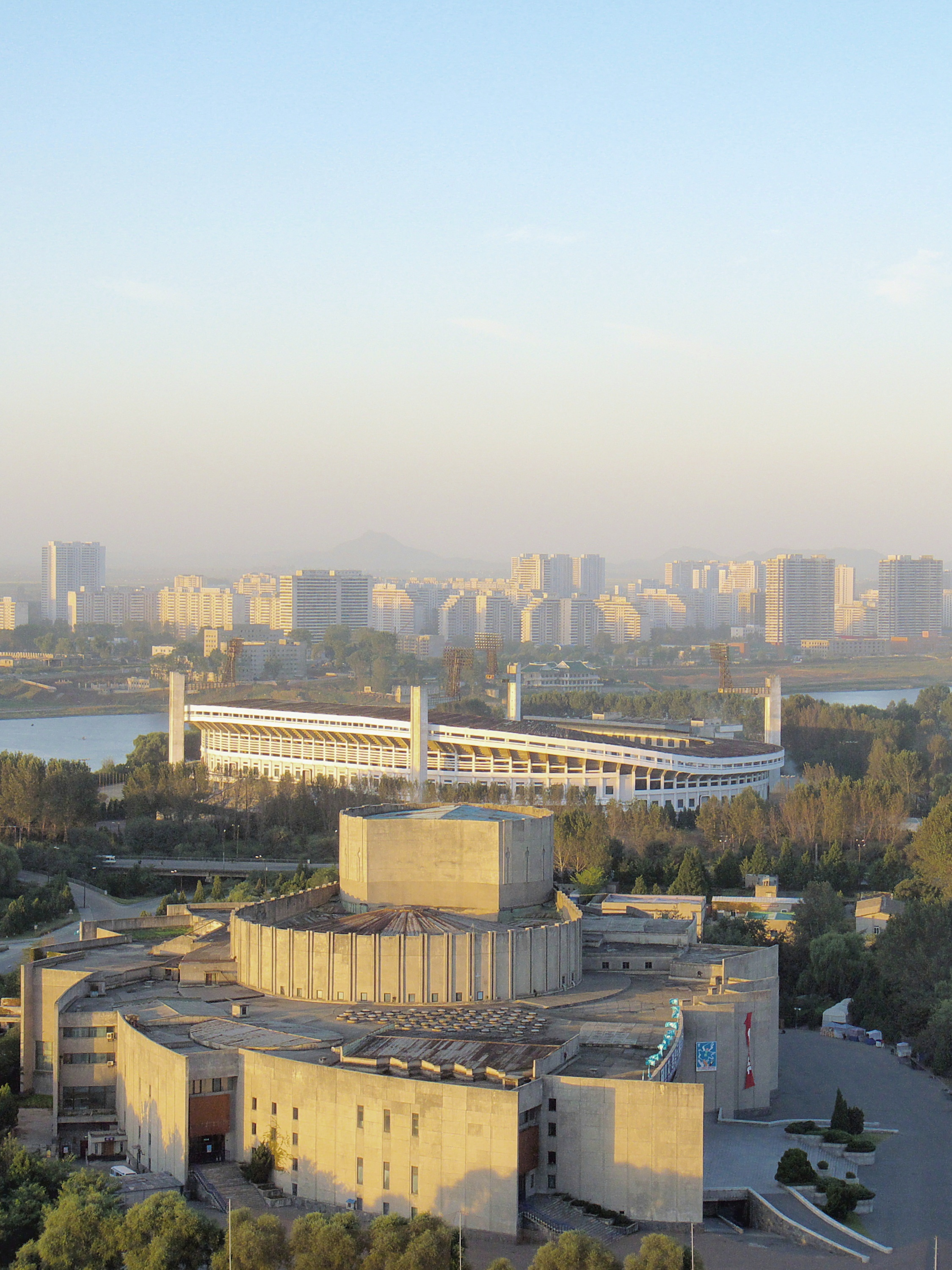
International Cinema Hall

The International Cinema Hall (Korean: 평양국제영화회관) is a cinema located in North Korea. It holds the Pyongyang International Film Festival.

== See also ==
- List of theatres in North Korea
