= Monument to Party Founding =

Architectural structure in Pyongyang, North Korea

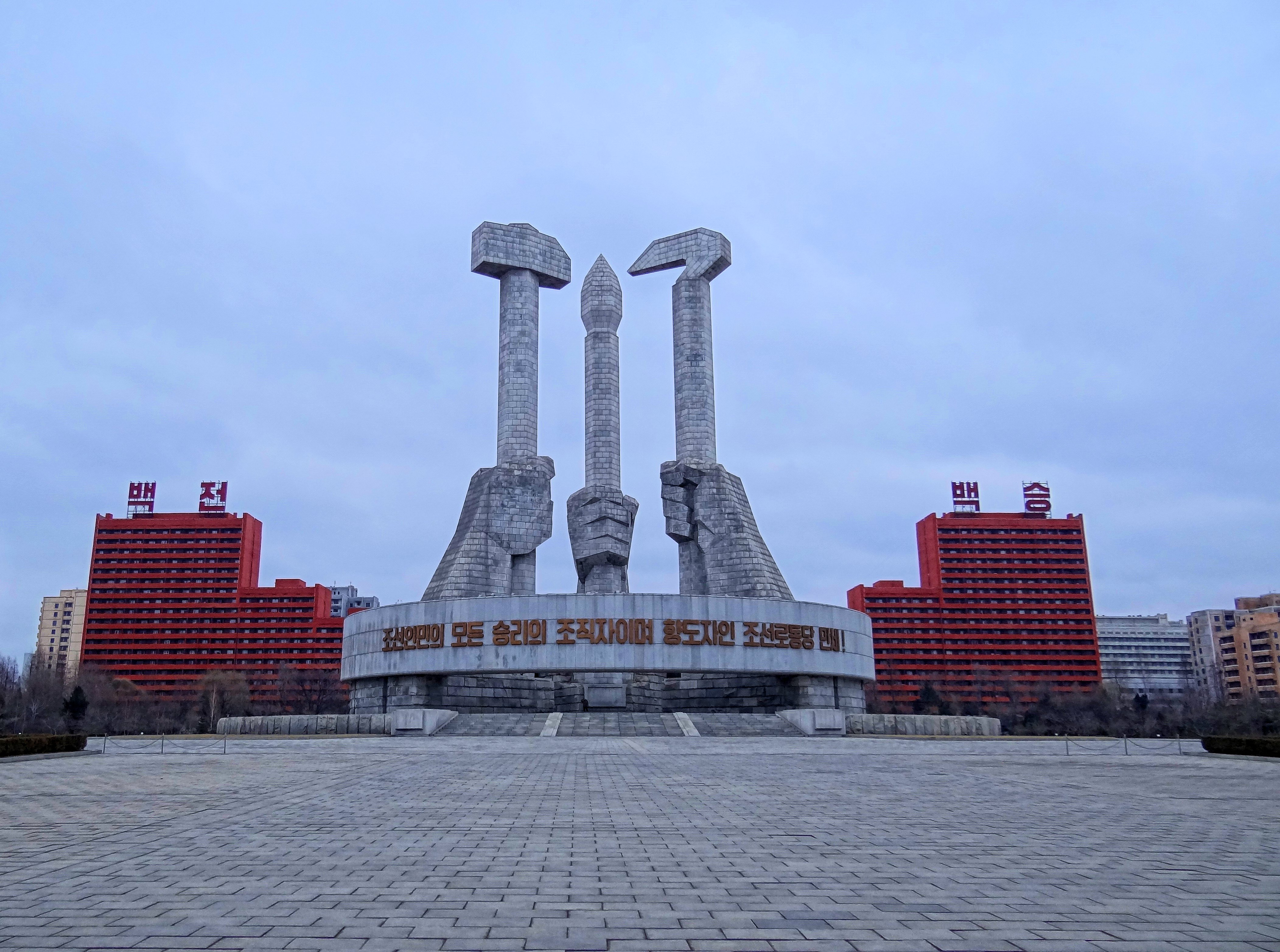
- The monument with the surrounding flag-shaped buildings
- Interactive map of Monument to Party Founding
- Location: Pyongyang, North Korea
- Coordinates: 39°1′40″N 125°46′35″E
- Designer: Mansudae Art Studio
- Material: Granite and bronze
- Length: Belt: 50 m outer and 42 m inner diameter; Base: 70 m diameter
- Height: 50 meters (160 ft)
- Opening date: 10 October 1995
- Dedicated to: The foundation of the Workers' Party of Korea

Korean name
- Chosŏn'gŭl: 당창건기념탑
- Hancha: 黨創建紀念塔
- Revised Romanization: Dangchanggeonginyeomtap
- McCune–Reischauer: Tangch'anggŏnkinyŏmt'ap

The Monument to Party Founding (Korean: 당창건기념탑; MR: Tangch'anggŏnkinyŏmt'ap) is a monument in Pyongyang, the capital of North Korea.

The monument is rich in symbolism: its hammer, sickle and calligraphy brush symbolize the workers, farmers and intellectuals. It is 50 meters high to symbolize the 50-year anniversary of the founding of the Workers' Party of Korea. The number of slabs comprising the belt around the monument and its diameter stand for the date of birth of Kim Jong Il. The inscription on the outer belt says "Long live the leader and organizer of the victories of the people of Korea, the Workers' Party of Korea!" On the inside of the belt are three bronze reliefs with their distinct meanings: the historical roots of the party, the unity of people under the party and the party's vision for a progressive future. Two red flag-shaped buildings with letters forming the words "100 battles, 100 victories" surround the monument.

== History ==
The monument, designed by Mansudae Art Studio, was completed on 10 October 1995, on the 50th anniversary of the foundation of the Workers' Party of Korea. A previous monument dedicated to the foundation had been erected on 10 October 1975 on the grounds of the Party Founding Museum.

The Monument to Party Founding appeared on postage stamps in 1995 and 2005 and is featured on the 50 won banknote.

== Features ==
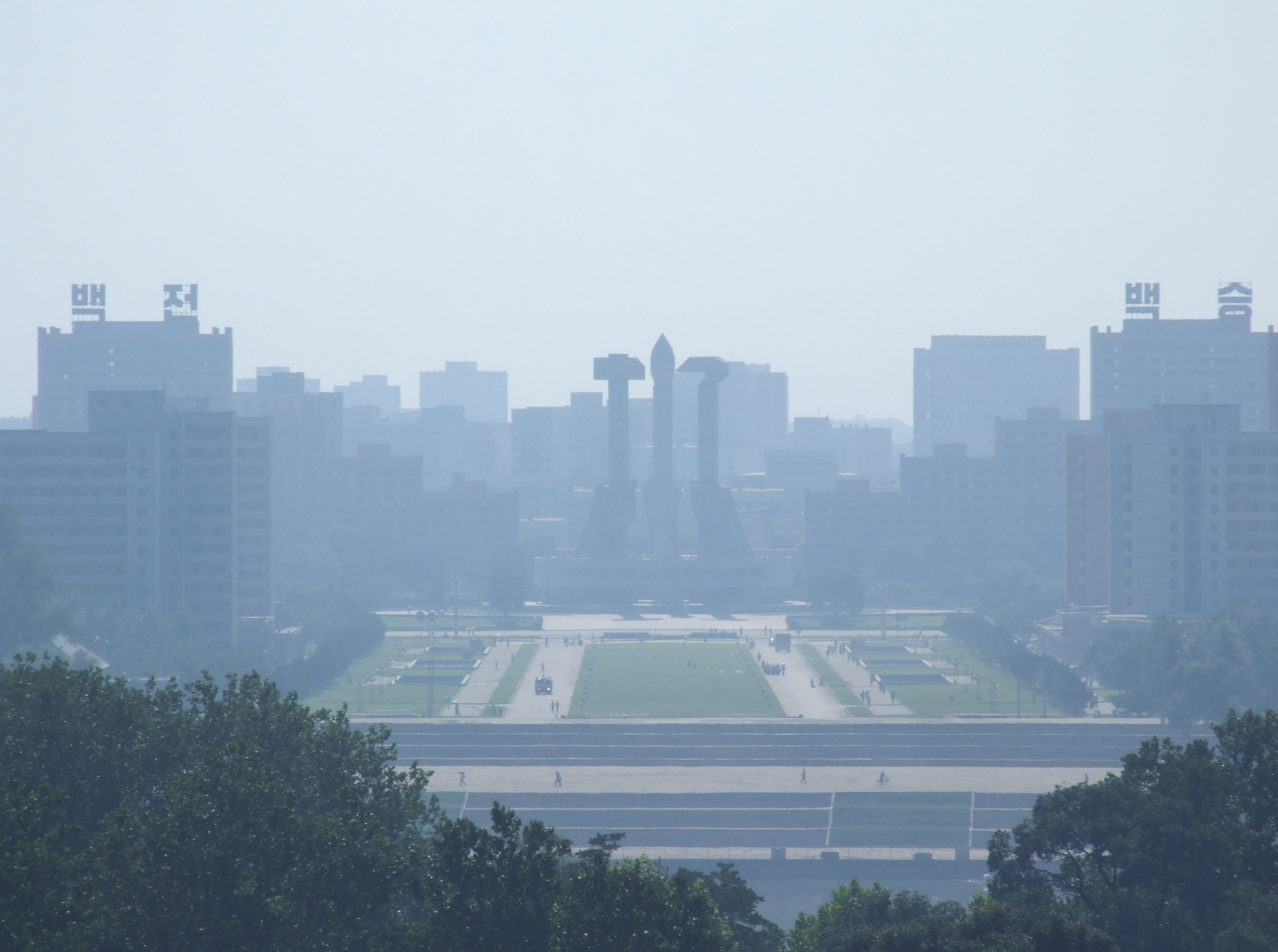
The monument was directly opposite to the Mansu Hill Grand Monument on the other side of the Taedong River from where it can be seen before being block by the newly constructed Pyongyang General Hospital.

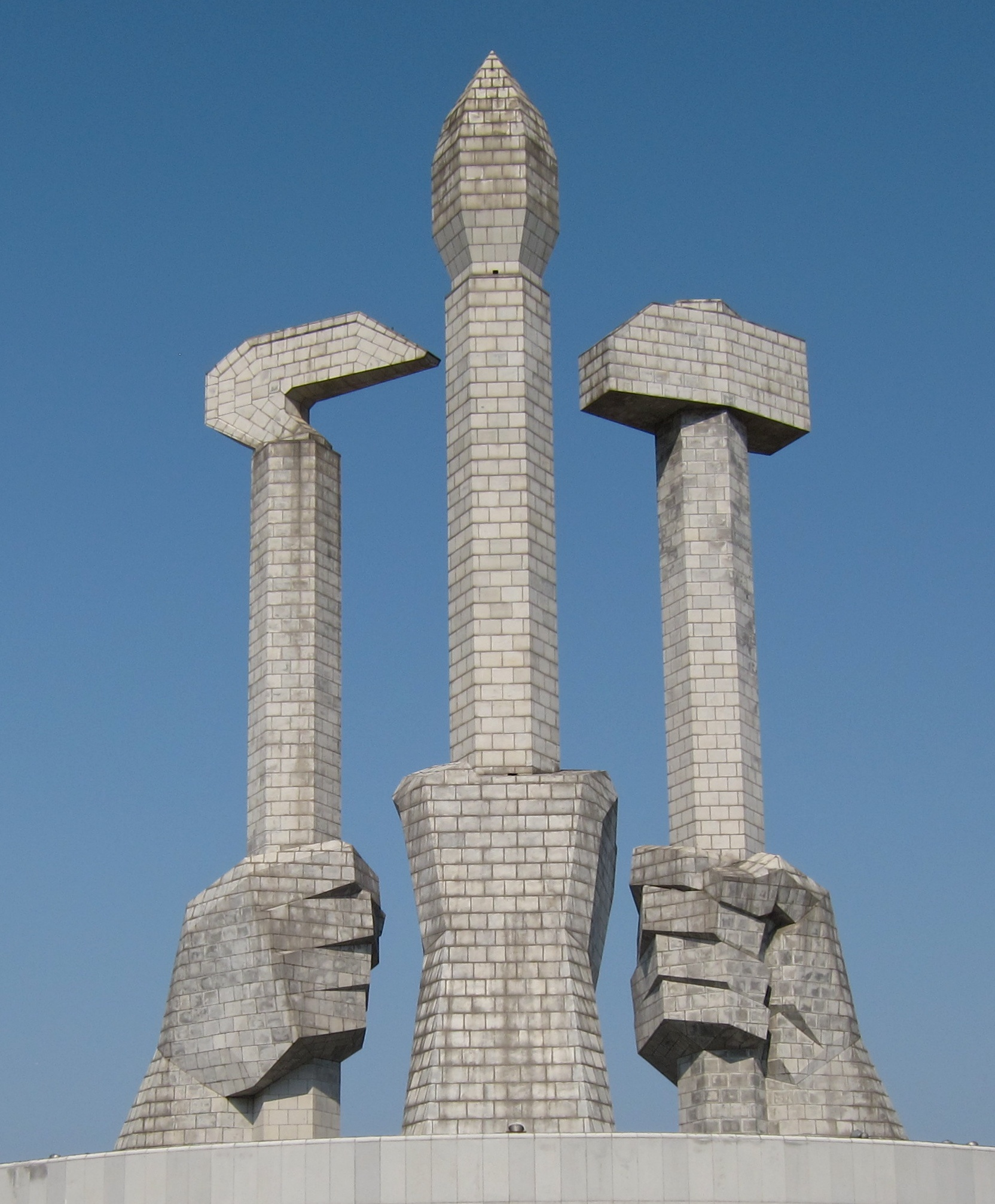
The element based on the emblem of the Workers' Party symbolizes the worker, farmer and intellectual.

The monument is situated on Munsu Street in the Taedonggang District of Pyongyang, on the bank of the Taedong River. On the opposite side of the river is the Mansu Hill Grand Monument, and the Korean Revolutionary Museum, both of which the Monument to Party Founding is symmetrically aligned with. This axis across the center of Pyongyang symbolizes the dynasty of Kim Il Sung and Kim Jong Il. The alignment later block by the newly build Pyongyang General Hospital, constucted on the front of the monument.

The monument site in its entirety spans 25,000 square meters. This includes a plaza in front of the monument where dances and festivities are held. The lawn of the park surrounding the monument is 15,000 square meters in extent. There are 12 fountain basins. The grounds are spotted with more than 53,000 trees.

There are symmetrical, waving flag-shaped, red residential buildings on either side of the monument. The letters on top of the buildings read: "ever-victorious".

The monument itself is made of granite and the reliefs are bronze.

Three highest element of the monument features three clenched fists holding a hammer, sickle and a calligraphy brush. The hammer and sickle symbolize workers and farmers and the brush intellectuals. The triumvirate is based on the emblem of the Workers' Party of Korea. The monument reaches to a height of 50 meters to signify the 50th anniversary of the party.

The architectural style bears resemblance to concrete structures in the city, such as the Pyongyang Ice Rink or the Ryugyong Hotel.

=== Belt ===
The three fists are surrounded by a belt, symbolizing the "single-hearted unity of the leader, Party and people". The inscription on the outer belt reads: "Long live the leader and organizer of the victories of the people of Korea, the Workers' Party of Korea!" (Korean: 조선인민의 모든 승리의 조직자이며 향도자인 조선로동당 만세!; MR: Chosŏninminŭi modŭn sŭngniŭi chojikchaimyŏ hyangdojain chosŏllodongdang manse!) The diameter of the belt is 50 meters on the outside and 42 meters on the inside. The belt is made of 216 blocks. The 216 blocks and the 42-meter inner diameter symbolize the date 16 February 1942, the purported date of birth of Kim Jong Il. In reality, he was born on 16 February 1941 in the Soviet Union.

The circular foundation under the monument is 70 meters in diameter symbolizing the about 70-year history of the party from the days of the Down-With-Imperialism Union. On the inside of the belt are three reliefs covering the history of the party.

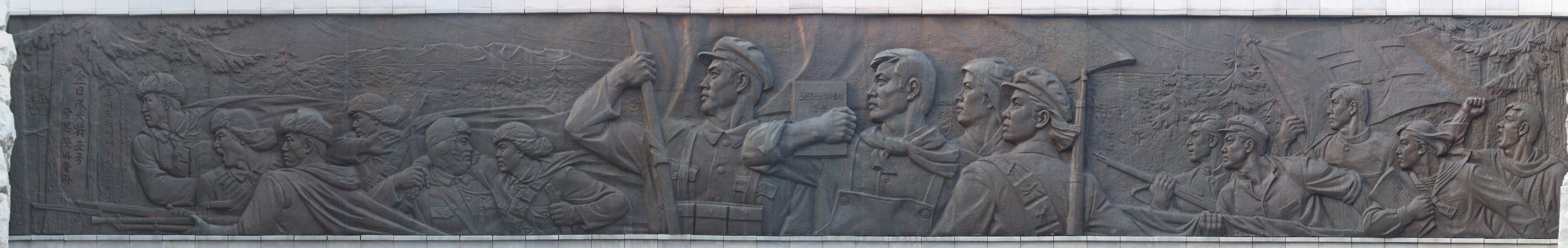
Depicts "the glorious revolutionary traditions of the Workers' Party of Korea": armed anti-Japanese struggle and the foundation of the Society for Rallying Comrades, Association for the Restoration of the Fatherland and the Down-With-Imperialism Union.
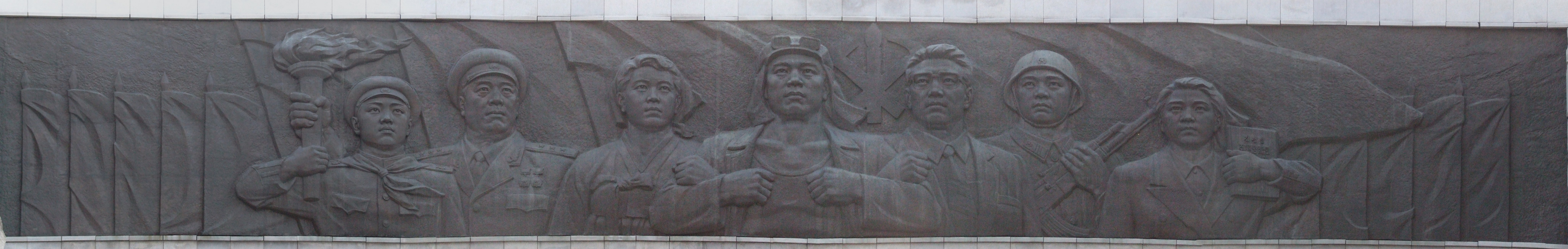
Depicts "the harmonious whole of the leader, the Party and the masses": veteran handing down the torch of Juche to the younger generation, and a worker, farmer, intellectual, soldier and a student united by the party flag.
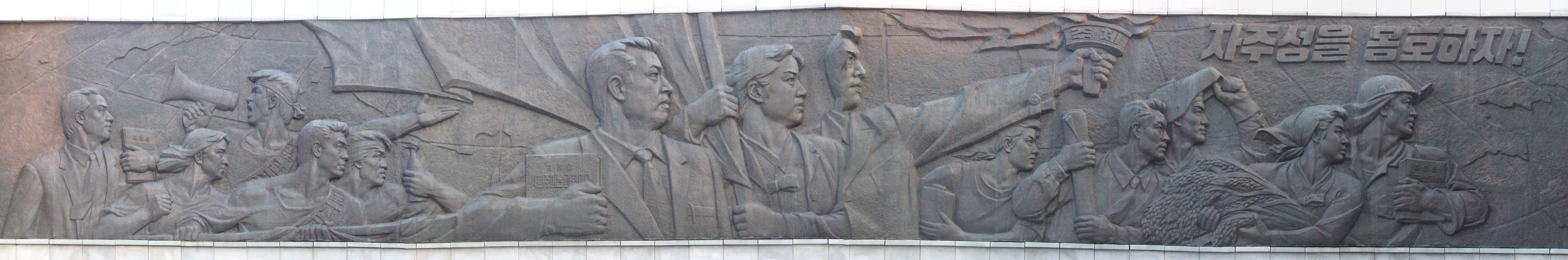
Depicts "the struggle to realize global independence": the desire for the advance of socialist construction under the torch of Juche. The inscription against the world map reads: "Let us defend independence!"

== See also ==
- Juche Tower
- Arch of Triumph (Pyongyang)
- Party Foundation Day
- History of the Workers' Party of Korea
- Socialist realism
- Culture of North Korea
- Korean architecture
