= Party Foundation Day =

Public holiday in North Korea

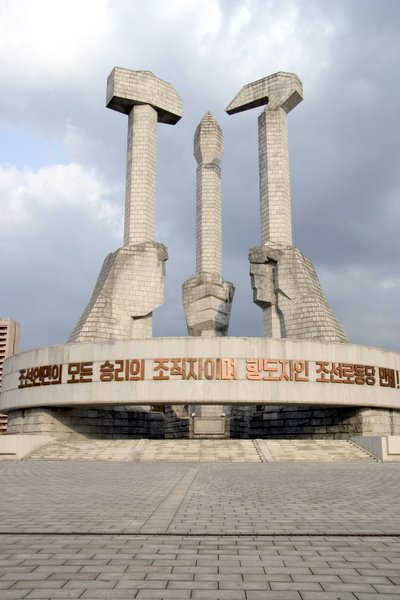
- Monument to Party Founding in Pyongyang
- Observed by: North Korea
- Significance: Founding of the North Korea Bureau of the Communist Party of Korea (1945), a predecessor to the Workers' Party of Korea
- Date: 10 October
- Next time: 10 October 2027
- Frequency: annual
- Related to: Day of the Shining Star (16 February), Day of the Sun (15 April), Day of the Foundation of the Republic (9 September)

The Party Foundation Day (Korean: 조선로동당 창건일) is an annual public holiday in North Korea marking the 10 October 1945 foundation of the "Central Organizing Committee of the Communist Party of North Korea" (북조선공산당중앙조직위원회), known as the "North Korea Bureau of the Communist Party of Korea" in the West and considered a predecessor to the ruling Workers' Party of Korea.

The Party Founding Day is one of the most important holidays of the country, along with the Day of the Sun (birthday of Kim Il Sung), Day of the Shining Star (birthday of Kim Jong Il) and Day of the Foundation of the Republic. 2025 marked the 80th anniversary.

== Background ==
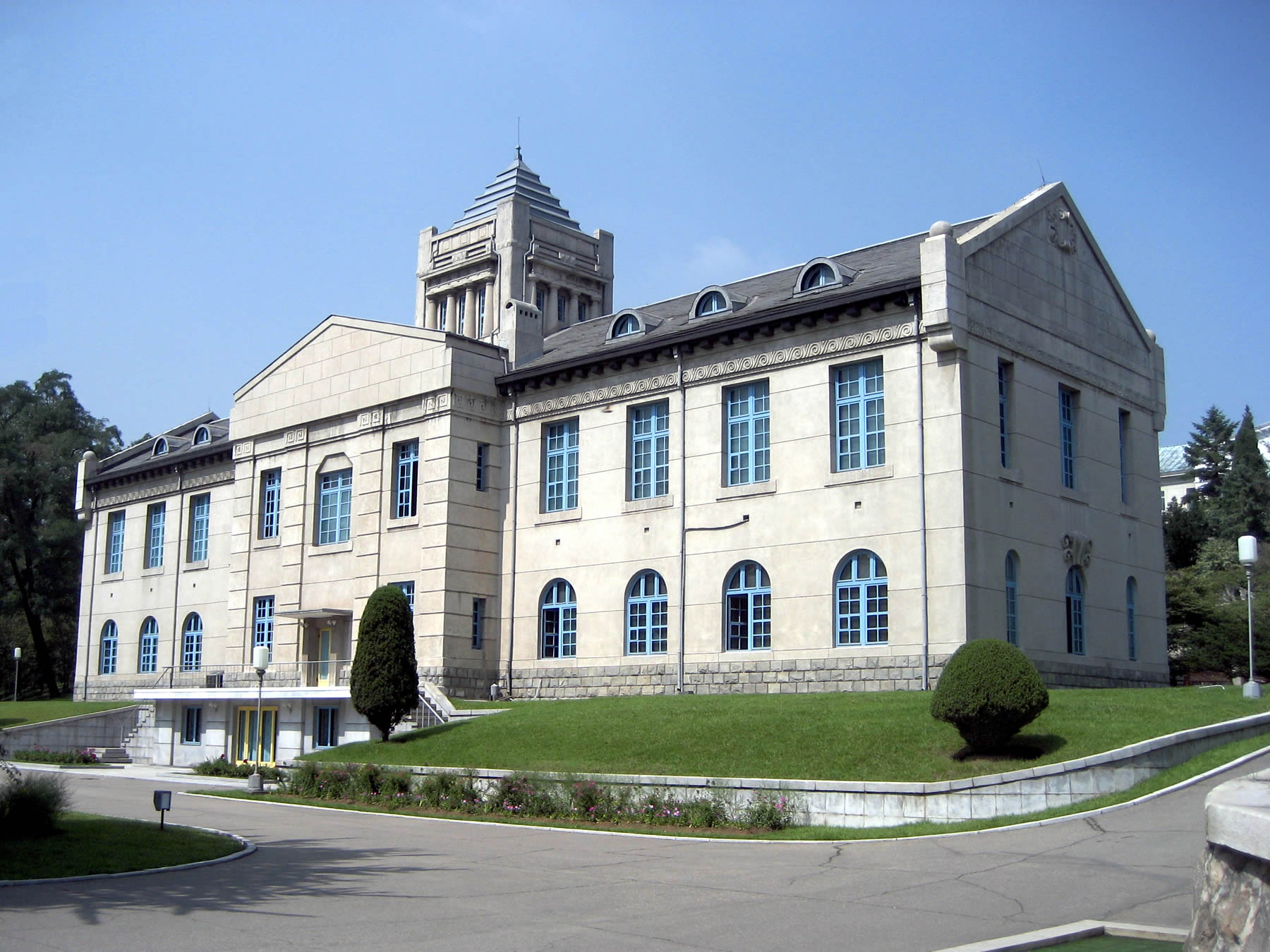
The public hall where the founding conference was held now hosts the Party Founding Museum.

North Korea commemorates 10 October 1945 as the date of the foundation of the "Central Organizing Committee of the Communist Party of North Korea", known as the "North Korea Bureau of the Communist Party of Korea" by Western historians.

On 10 October 1945 a meeting called "Conference of Korean Communist Party Members and Enthusiasts in the Five Northwestern Provinces" began in Pyongyang, in a public hall that now hosts the Party Founding Museum. On 13 October, the meeting saw the establishment of the North Korea Bureau of the Communist Party of Korea. The conference was the first time that Kim Il Sung emerged as a political force. Kim advocated the foundation of the North Korea Bureau so that party activities could be overseen in the north of the country in a situation where the north and south were occupied by the Soviets and the Americans respectively. Kim acceded the chairmanship of the North Korea Bureau some two months after the conference. The Bureau soon became independent of the Seoul-lead Communist Party of Korea, paving the way for a political force in the North.

The North Korea Bureau is one in a series of predecessors to the present Workers' Party of Korea. The North Korea Bureau evolved into the Workers' Party of North Korea in August 1946. The present Workers' Party of Korea was not founded until 24 June 1949 when the Workers' Party of North Korea merged with the Workers' Party of South Korea.

== Celebrations ==
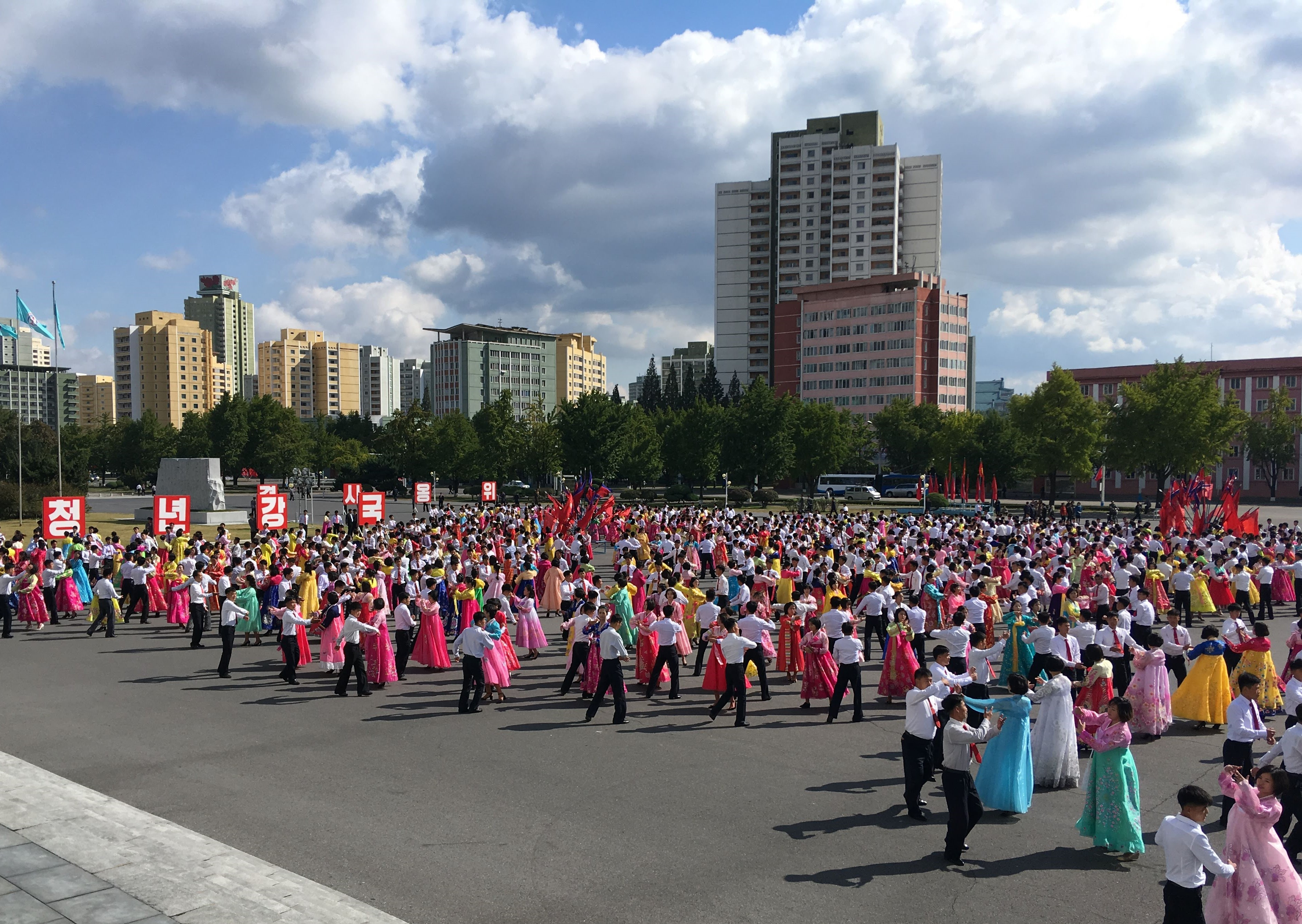
Mass dance in Pyongyang on Party Foundation Day.

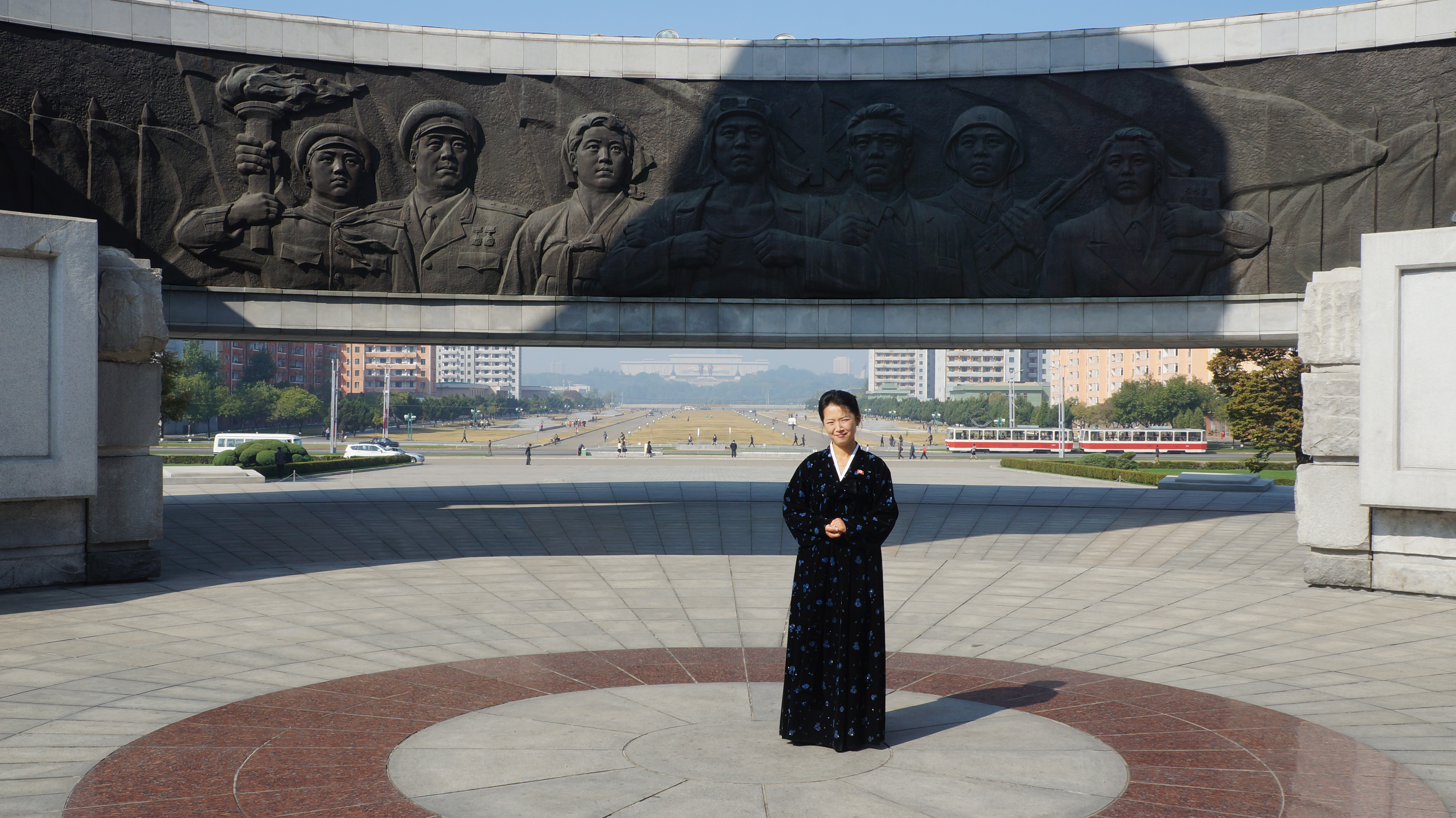
A tour guide visiting the Monument to Party Founding in Pyongyang around the anniversary

Celebrations include song and dance performances, evening galas, speeches, lectures on revolutionary history and oratorical meetings. Floral tributes are laid in front of statues of Kim Il Sung. Special food rations are distributed. This usually includes foodstuffs that are normally in short supply, such as oil and snacks. Meat is available through the public distribution system. During Kim Jong Un's reign, the holiday has grown in significance as an occasion to showcase North Korea's growing military capibilities.

Electricity is provided on the Party Foundation Day, despite shortages. There are live TV broadcasts of ceremonies. The holiday is celebrated throughout the country, though main celebrations take place in the capital, Pyongyang. The city typically hosts processions and a military parade during the day. Attendance in festivities in the capital is counted in the millions.

The celebrations have included occasional ceremonial visits of North Korean leaders to the Kumsusan Palace of the Sun. The failure of Kim Jong Un to appear in 2014 intensified speculations of his lengthy absence. The tradition has not been very strong, as in comparison to Kim Jong Un, his father Kim Jong Il observed the same tradition only twice.

North Korea schedules completion of large-scale construction projects to coincide with important anniversaries like the Party Foundation Day. The 50th anniversary of the party in 1995, for instance, was met with unveiling of the Monument to Party Founding. The 70th anniversary in 2015 was planned to be celebrated with the completion of a stock breeding base and a power plant: the Sepho Tableland and the Chongchon River Power Plant. The latter was finished by the next month. Also on the 2015 celebration, a major concert took place, the Great Party, Rosy Korea. The 2026 main celebration took place at the Pyongyang Gymnasium.

Banks, offices, retail and government institutions close for the day. Weddings are often organized on the day.

== See also ==
- Public holidays in North Korea
- Down-with-Imperialism Union
