= Pyongyang General Hospital =

General hospital in Pyongyang, North Korea

Geography
- Location: Pyongyang, North Korea
- Coordinates: 39°01′43″N 125°46′18″E

Organisation
- Type: General

Services
- Beds: 1,000

Helipads
- Helipad: Yes

History
- Constructed: 19 March 2020
- Opened: 6 October 2025 (inauguration); 3 November 2025 (opening)

Links
- Lists: Hospitals in North Korea

- Pyongyang General Hospital
- Hangul: 평양종합병원
- Hanja: 平壤綜合病院
- RR: Pyeongyang jonghap byeongwon
- MR: P'yŏngyang chonghap pyŏngwŏn

The Pyongyang General Hospital (Korean: 평양종합병원) is a hospital in Pyongyang, North Korea. The hospital is located in front of the Monument to Party Founding. Its groundbreaking took place on 19 March 2020, during the COVID-19 pandemic, and its construction proceeded on the basis of a "speed campaign" with an expected completion date of October 2020, before the 75th anniversary celebrations of the Workers' Party of Korea. The hospital did not meet the planned deadline, though by 27 February 2025, the hospital had already been completed and was ready to be inaugurated on the 80th anniversary of the Worker's Party of Korea.

In 2025, Kim Jong Un visited the hospital on 27 February and 23 September, and he inaugurated the hospital on 6 October. The Pyongyang General Hospital began receiving patients and opened on 3 November 2025.

== Background ==
NK News reported that the project had been agreed at a four-day meeting ending on 31 December 2019, which had "discussed and decided on the tasks to first construct a modern general hospital in Pyongyang for the promotion of the health of the people for the 75th Party Foundation anniversary". At the groundbreaking ceremony, Kim Jong Un admitted that there were "numerous obstacles" to completing the hospital in such short a time and that completion of the hospital would come at the expense of other projects. After groundbreaking, several officials penned op-eds in Rodong Sinmun vowing to wage "all-night battles" for the hospital's construction.

The hospital is considered the first major project of the "head-on breakthrough" campaign, in the mould of the Chollima Movement, conceived in the wake of the failure of the Hanoi summit (and the corresponding lack of sanctions relief) and the subsequent downplaying of the five-year plan.

== Construction ==
By 2 April, foundation works were already 63% complete, according to The Pyongyang Times. By 15 June, the two towers of the hospital had topped-out.

The hospital was worked on past the original deadline of October 2020, and preparations for the operation of the hospital were 'pushed ahead'.

In January 2021, Radio Free Asia reported that the exterior of the hospital was complete, but the interior was still incomplete, as the COVID-19 pandemic and sanctions against North Korea stalled importing hospital equipment. In April 2023, it was published that in June 2022 Kim Jong Un approved the hospital's interior designs as well as the uniforms of the medical staff.

== Inauguration and opening ==
On 27 February 2025, Kim visited the completed hospital, which KCNA reported as ready to be inaugurated in October, on time for the 80th anniversary of the founding of the Workers' Party of Korea. He expressed his satisfaction with the completed hospital project. Kim visited the hospital again on 23 September; in the photos taken by KCNA, the medical devices and beds for patients are shown. Kim inaugurated the hospital on 6 October 2025, before the 80th anniversary of the Workers' Party of Korea.

On 4 November 2025, the Pyongyang General Hospital opened. KCNA reported that the hospital had started receiving patients the day prior. The hospital was part of Kim's pledge to build medical facilities in 20 cities and counties annually.
