= Party Founding Museum =

Museum in Pyongyang

- 당창건사적관
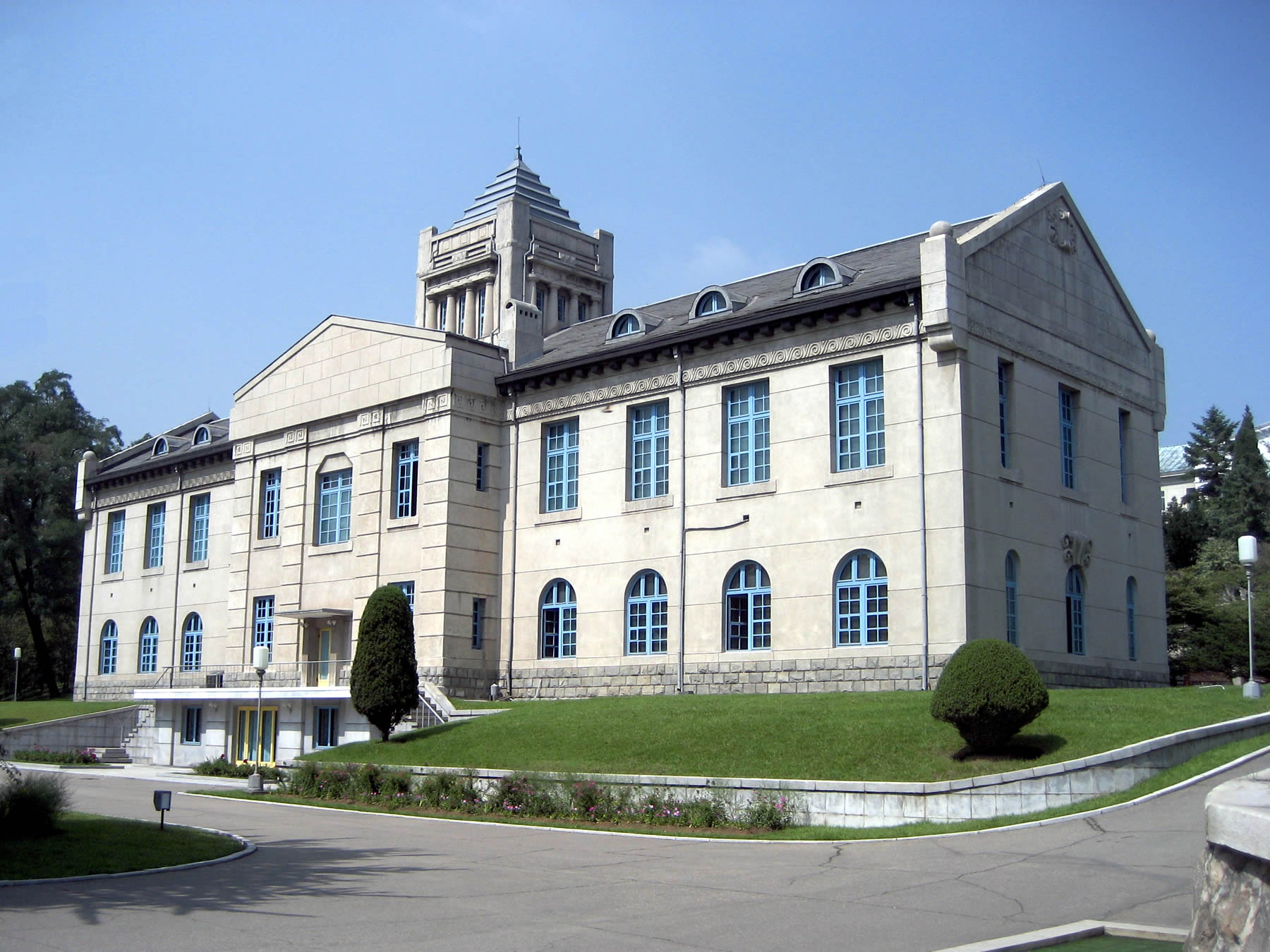
- Party Founding Museum (2010)
- Established: October 1970
- Location: Pyongyang, North Korea
- Coordinates: 39°0′43″N 125°44′34″E

The Party Founding Museum is a museum located in the Central District of Pyongyang, North Korea, on the south side of Mt. Haebang. The building was constructed by the Japanese occupation government in 1923. It was used as the South Pyongan Provincial Products Exhibition Center, and then the Chojiya Department Store Pyongyang Branch. After the Japanese defeat, it became the headquarters of the Central Organising Committee of the Communist Party of North Korea. In October 1970 it was turned into a museum dedicated to founding of the party. Nearby, and also part of the museum, is the modest house he inhabited during his early days as president of North Korea.

== History ==
The original building was built in 1923 by the Japanese occupation government, and opened as South Pyongan Province Merchandise Exhibition Hall. After his return to Korea after World War II, Kim Il Sung is alleged to have founded the Korean Workers' Party in this building on October 10, 1945, and here were held many of that group's first meetings. During the Korean War, the building was destroyed. The museum opened in October 1970. A monument to the founding of the Korean Workers' Party was installed on October 10, 1975.

== Layout ==
The building's architecture is of the typical Japanese colonial style; it is blocky and formal, and built out of dark gray stone. The roof of the building is modeled after the Imperial Diet Building in Tokyo.

The first floor features an exhibition of photos and artifacts, while the second floor is preserved in its original historic appearance.

== See also ==
- List of museums in North Korea
- Party Foundation Day
- Monument to Party Founding
