= List of museums in North Korea =

This is a list of museums in North Korea.

== List ==
- International Friendship Exhibition
- Kimilsungia and Kimjongilia Exhibition Hall
- Goryo History Museum
- Korea Stamp Museum
- Korean Art Gallery
- Korean Central History Museum
- Korean Folklore Museum
- Korean Revolution Museum
- Memorial Museum of Combat Feats at the Overseas Military Operations (해외군사작전 전투위훈기념관)
- Museum of Natural History, Pyongyang (자연박물관)
- Korea Central Zoo
- Mangyondae Revolutionary Museum
- Museum of Weapons and Equipment of the Korean People's Army (조선인민군무장장비관)
- North Korea Peace Museum
- Party Founding Museum
- Pyongyang Metro Construction Museum (지하철도건설박물관)
- Pyongyang Railway Museum
- Pyongyang City Museum
- Rangrang museum (낙랑박물관)
- Revolutionary Museum of the Ministry of the People's Armed Forces
- Sinchon Museum of American War Atrocities
- Three Revolutions Exhibition
- USS Pueblo (AGER-2)
- Victorious War Museum
- Wonsan History Museum

== See also ==
- List of museums
- Revolutionary Sites
