= Korean Folklore Museum =

North Korean Museum

Coordinates: 39°01′17″N 125°45′18″E

The Korean Folklore Museum (조선민속박물관) is a museum in North Korea, located north of the Korean Central History Museum next to the Taedong Gate in Pyongyang. It was opened in February 1956. The museum has seven rooms comprising 1,800 square meters of space, with 2,100 exhibits.

== See also ==
- List of museums in North Korea
