= Mansudae Grand Monument =

Complex in Pyongyang, North Korea

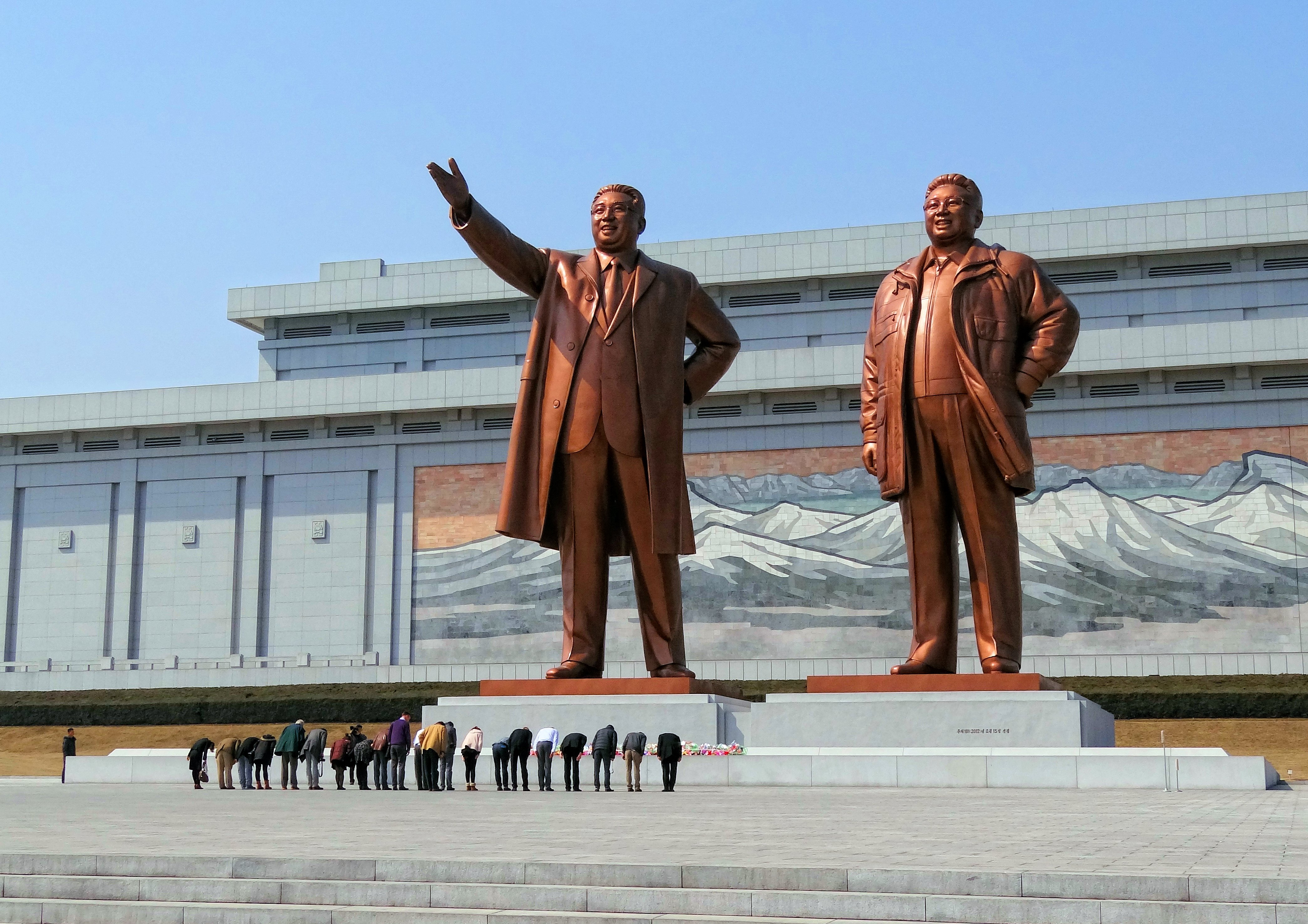
- Interactive map of Mansudae Grand Monument
- Location: Mansu Hill, Pyongyang, North Korea
- Coordinates: 39°1′55″N 125°45′12″E
- Designer: Mansudae Art Studio
- Type: Memorial and Statue complex
- Material: Main statues: bronze, goldleaf (former); Supporting statues: granite, limestone
- Height: 22 m (72 ft)
- Completion date: 1972 (Kim Il Sung statue), 2012 (Kim Jong Il statue)
- Restored date: 2012, 2013, 2024
- Dedicated to: Eternal leaders of North Korea; Anti-Japanese revolutionary struggle; Socialist reconstruction

Korean name
- Hangul: 만수대대기념비
- Hanja: 萬壽臺大紀念碑
- RR: Mansudae daeginyeombi
- MR: Mansudae taeginyŏmbi

The Mansudae Grand Monument (Korean: 만수대대기념비) is a complex of monuments in Pyongyang, North Korea. There are 229 figures in all, commemorating the history of the revolutionary struggle of the Korean people, and especially their leaders. The central part of the monument consists of two 22-meter-tall (72 ft) bronze statues of Kim Il Sung and Kim Jong Il.

== History ==
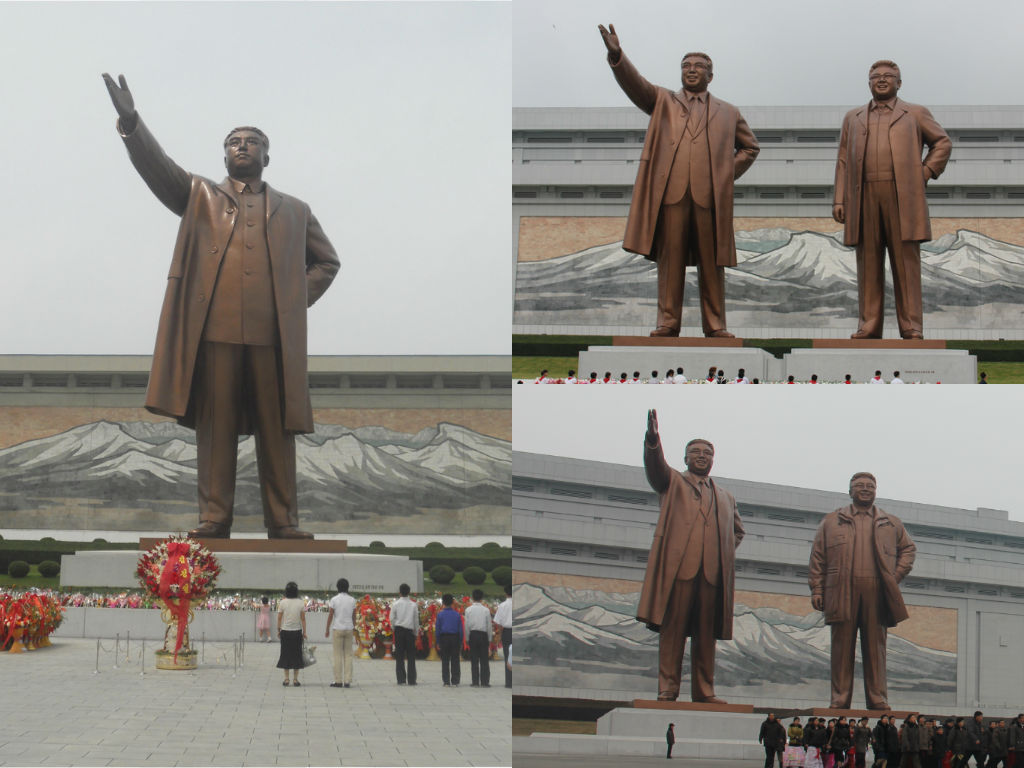
The monument over time: Left: A 2010 photo of the original statue of a younger Kim Il-sung, wearing an overcoat and Mao suit. Top right: A 2012 photo of an updated statue of Kim Il-sung depicting him as an older, smiling statesman wearing a Western suit, and an additional statue of Kim Jong-il. Bottom right: A 2014 photo showing Kim Jong-il with a new parka.

In April 1972, Kim Jong Il erected the monument in honor of Kim Il Sung's 60th birthday. The monument features the Great Leader alone overlooking Pyongyang. Five years later, the statue was covered in gold leaf. Soon after, this gold plating was removed after a visit from Deng Xiaoping, who, after seeing the monument, expressed displeasure with how Chinese aid was being spent.

Following Kim Jong Il's death in 2011, a similar statue of him was erected on the north side of Kim Il Sung. At the same time, Kim Il Sung's statue was altered to portray him at a later age and smiling. Kim Il Sung's original Mao suit was also replaced with a Western-style suit. The statue of Kim Jong Il initially featured a long coat but it was promptly changed to his signature parka. South Korean sources have estimated the cost of the additional statue at $10 million, with North Korean workers working overseas being ordered to donate $150 each towards the monument.

Daily NK reported that satellite images showed construction activity (cranes and canopy) around the statues from late April until early June 2024. According to Daily NK, construction activity included: cleaning, polishing, painting, plating, rust removal, upgrading the lightning rods, and upgrading the sound system which plays solemn music around the clock. They also reported that during the construction period, maintenance was also performed on a hydraulic elevator system in a tunnel under the statues.

== Description ==
Behind the central statues is a wall of the Korean Revolution Museum building, displaying a mosaic mural showing a scene from Mount Paektu, considered to be the sacred mountain of revolution. On either side of the statues, leading away from the building, are two monuments consisting of statues of different soldiers, workers, and farmers in their anti-Japanese revolutionary struggle and socialist revolution. The long line of human figures depicted on them are on average 5 m (16 ft) tall.

An official North Korean website describes it thus:

The group sculptures represent in a comprehensive way the immortal history of revolutionary struggle of the Korean people who have recorded only victory and glory under the wise leadership of the great Generalissimos. Not only on national holidays and commemoration days but on ordinary days it is crowded with people to present floral baskets and bouquets before the statues. Wedding couples are often seen there. The visiting foreigners, too, climb the hill and pay their high tribute to the great Generalissimos.

— Official North Korean web site

All visitors to the site, both locals and foreigners, are expected to bow to show respect. Locals are required to leave flowers in order to show respect and foreigners are also given the option. Photos of the statues are permitted, but the photos must capture the statues in their entirety. Close-up photos of any part of the leader's statues are strictly forbidden.
