= Mansudae Art Studio =

North Korean art studio

Coordinates: 39°0′48″N 125°42′53″E

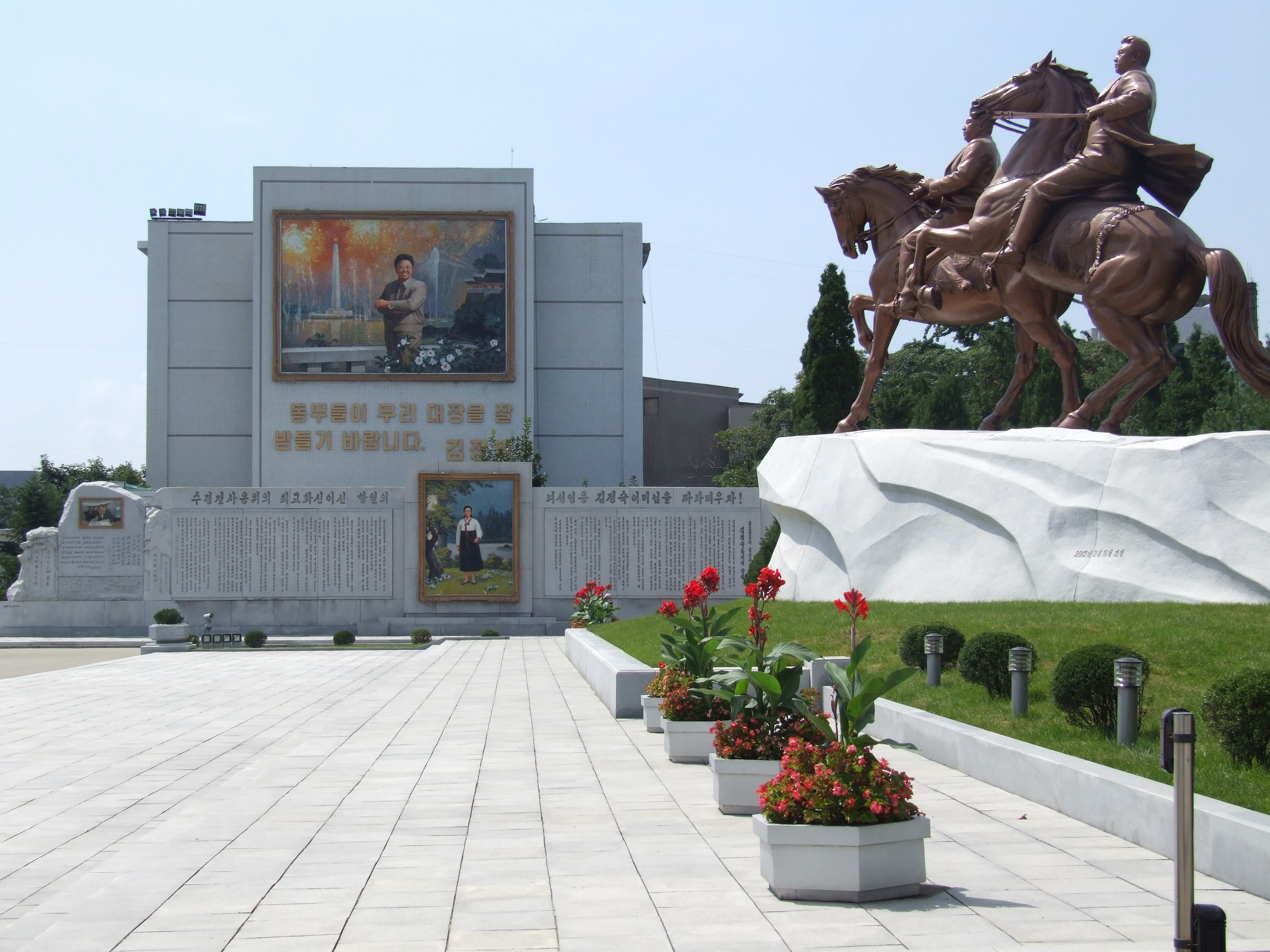

Korean name
- Hangul: 만수대창작사
- Hanja: 萬壽臺創作社
- RR: Mansudae changjaksa
- MR: Mansudae ch'angjaksa

The Mansudae Art Studio is an art studio in Phyongchon District, Pyongyang, North Korea. It was founded in 1959, and it is one of the largest centers of art production in the world, at an area of over 120,000 square meters. The studio employs around 4,000 people, 1,000 of whom are artists picked from the best academies in North Korea. Most of its artists are graduates of Pyongyang University. The studio consists of 13 groups, including those for woodcuts, charcoal drawings, ceramics, embroidery and jewel paintings, among other things.

The studio has produced many of North Korea's most important monuments, such as the Monument to the Founding of the Korean Workers Party, the Chollima Statue, and the Mansu Hill Grand Monument. Its foreign commercial division is known as the Mansudae Overseas Project Group of Companies, which as of 2014 has created monuments for 18 African and Asian nations. As of 2015, Mansudae projects have been built in 17 countries: Angola, Algeria, Benin, Botswana, Cambodia, Chad, Democratic Republic of Congo, Egypt, Equatorial Guinea, Ethiopia, Germany, Malaysia, Mali, Mozambique, Namibia, Senegal, Togo and Zimbabwe. All images of the Kim family are produced by the Mansudae Art Studio. Before his death, the Mansudae Art Studio was under the guidance of Kim Jong Il. Since 2009, the studio has had its own space also in the 798 Art District in Beijing, China, known as the Mansudae Art Museum.

== Organization and management ==
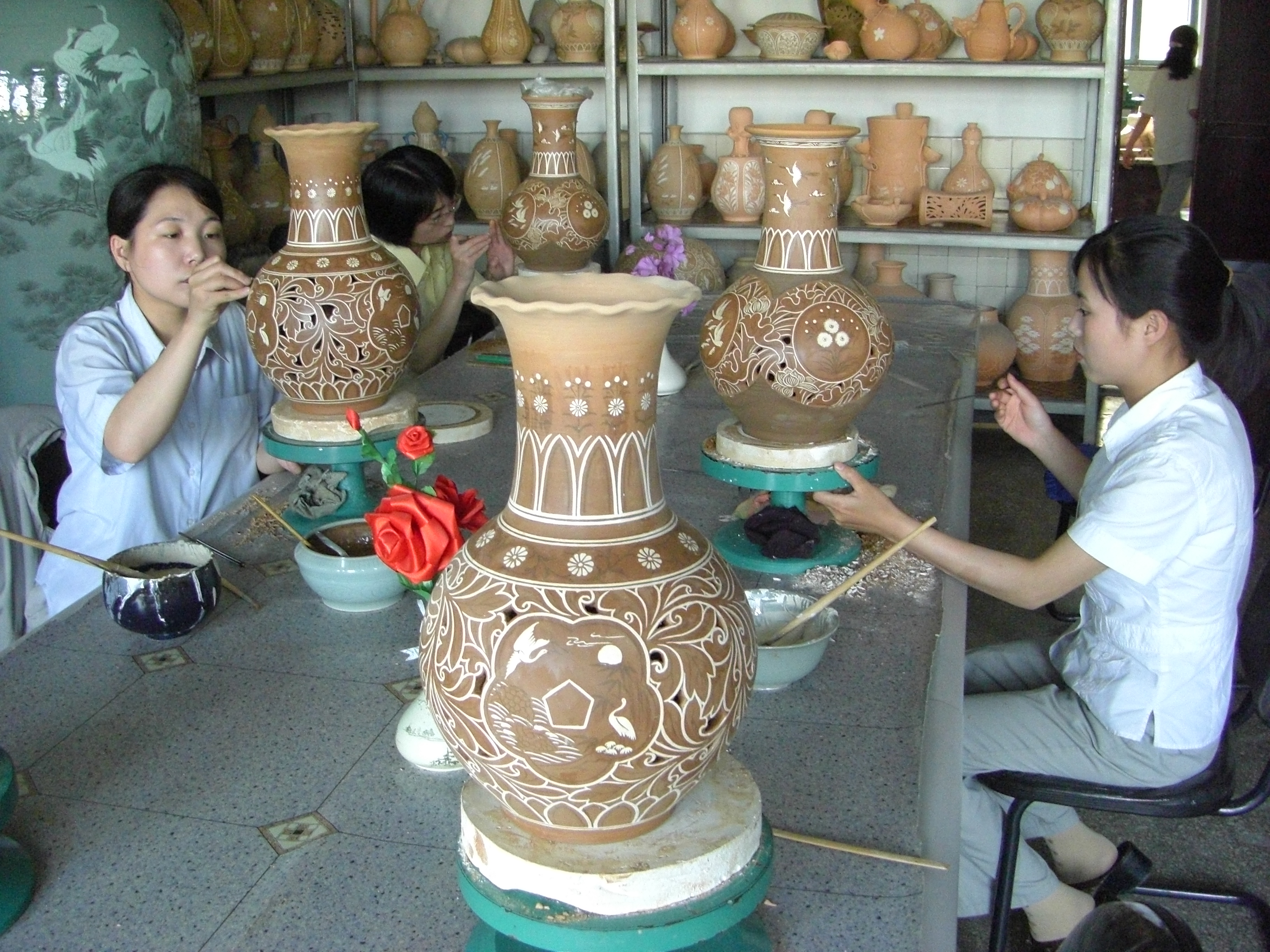
Artists working on ceramics at Mansudae Art Studio

The studio consists of around 4,000 workers, approximately 1,000 of whom are artists aged from their mid-20s to mid-60s and selected from the best academies in the country, especially from Pyongyang University of Fine Arts. The studio takes up over 120,000 square meters, 80,000 of which are indoors. The campus-like studio includes a soccer stadium, sauna, medical clinic, paper mill, kindergarten, and even a gift shop. The studio is a state-approved destination for foreign tourists, and the gift shop has enabled tourists to purchase North Korean art for years, as selling artwork is one of the North Korea state's easiest means of gaining foreign currency. The studio is made up of thirteen groups that manufacture different types of artwork (ranging from oil paintings to ceramics and bronze statues), manufacturing plants, and more than 50 supply departments that produce and test art materials such as paint. According to the studio's official website, the studio is not a school or a Chinese-style chain factory, but rather a high quality production center that employs over half of the nation's artists who have received the two highest artistic awards available in North Korea. The manager of the studio's website, Pier Luigi Cecioni, has also claimed that the Mansudae Art Studio receives profits from the website's sales directly, as it has economic autonomy. Mansudae Art Studio has a sports team in the annual Paektusan Prize Games of Civil Servants.

== History ==
The Mansudae Art Studio was established in Pyongyang, the capital of North Korea, on November 17, 1959, six years after the end of the Korean War. Before his death in 2011, the studio operated under Kim Jong Il's "special guidance."

== Ties with Italy ==
The Mansudae Art Studio's affiliation with Italy began in 2005 with Pier Luigi Cecioni, whose position as president of an orchestra in Florence, Italy allowed him to come into contact with the studio. Cecioni's orchestra was invited to perform at the Spring Friendship Festival held in Pyongyang. While in Pyongyang, Cecioni inquired as to whether North Korea had "any art center or gallery to show [him]," and was taken to Mansudae Art Studio which at the time was little known outside of North Korea. Cecioni offered to help the studio "do something in the West," and in January 2006 he returned to Pyongyang with his brother, an artist, Director of the Florence Fine Arts Academy in Florence, and director of an exhibition center near Florence. The Cecioni brothers selected several Mansudae works to bring back to Europe and signed an agreement of exclusivity, which established Pier Luigi Cecioni as a liaison between Mansudae and the West. A provision of this agreement was that Cecioni would organize exhibitions of artwork from Mansudae in the West.

Around the same time as the first of these exhibitions was organized, Cecioni began building the official web site of the Mansudae Art Studio. Cecioni facilitates the studio's international sales of small pieces of artwork, such as paintings, through this website, which offers a brief history of the studio, information about Mansudae exhibitions outside North Korea, a directory of Mansudae artists, and listings of paintings for sale.

Some artists from Mansudae have been periodically sent abroad, including to Italy. In 2012, Cecioni accompanied some Mansudae artists to the Uffizi Gallery and the Vatican Museums, which he said the North Korean artists appreciated and recognized from their university studies.

== Mansudae Art Museum ==
In 2009, Mansudae Art Studio's presence was made known in the 798 Art Zone in Beijing, China. The studio has its own space in 798 called Mansudae Art Museum, though unlike most museums many of the works in its collection are for sale and are comparable to paintings available on Mansudae's website. The museum sells both original and copied socialist-realist paintings, statues, and posters as well as stamps and postcards. The stamp and postcard themes range from nature to Kim family cars, but they mostly emphasize the relationship between North Korea and China (for example, there are stamps of every Chinese politician to have ever visited North Korea). The museum was the first North Korean art gallery abroad and is a North Korea-approved tourist destination. The museum's entrance is marked by a smaller version of Pyongyang's Chollima Statue sitting on top of a beige pedestal over six meters tall.

== Exhibitions and products ==
=== Exhibitions ===
Mansudae had its first overseas exhibition in London in July and August 2007 at La Galaria in Pall Mall curated by David Heather The then Ambassador attended the opening and it ran for six weeks. In 2009, Queensland Art Gallery approached Koryo Studio's Nicholas Bonner to commission works for the Asia Pacific Triennial the most prestigious exhibition for showing contemporary art from the Asia region. Despite much preparation by five invited Mansudae artists, an exhibition in Brisbane, Australia presented Mansudae artworks without their artists. Although only one of the fifteen pieces was socialist-realist, the Australian government denied the artists exceptions from a visa ban on North Korea because they came "from Pyongyang's propaganda machine and... are not welcome." On 10 October 2013, a popular Mansudae exhibition opened at a trade exposition in Dandong, China. The exhibition had no propaganda art and sold 30 pieces in its first three days. In 2014, David Heather, who curated the London exhibition in 2007, decided to recreate the success of the 2007 exhibition. The exhibition was held at the North Korean Embassy in the United Kingdom. The Mansudae artists involved with the event stayed in London for two weeks beforehand to prepare and were available to paint for people while in England.

=== Paintings ===
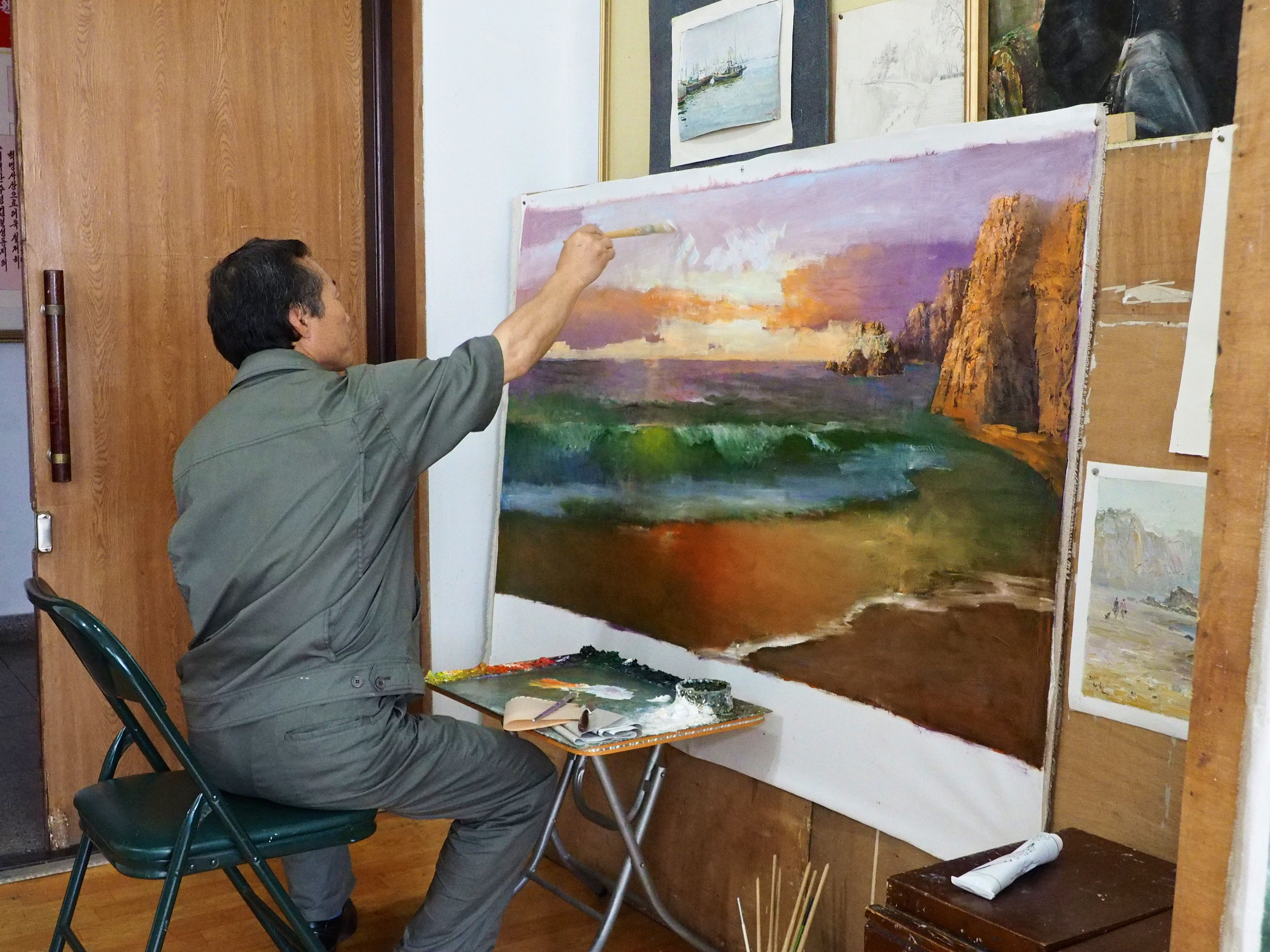
An artist painting at Mansudae Art Studio

Mansudae produces many paintings, including "all public images of Kim Jong Un, Kim Jong Il, and Kim Il Sung" and "One Can Always Lose, a series of 10 paintings depicting North Korea's 1-0 win over Italy during round one of the 1966 World Cup." Several of the paintings have a uniform style of depicting North Korea as a utopia. However, according to Klaus Klemp, the deputy director of Frankfurt's Museum of Applied Art, Mansudae artists can "produce kitschy knockoffs of several foreign genres" that are likely sold internationally. Mansudae's official website has a gallery of paintings ranging "from propaganda posters to lucid landscapes, flower bouquets, and even family portraits," as well as the occasional rare jewel painting. Jewel paintings are unique to North Korea and are made by grinding gems into powders that are put on a canvas by hand and never lose their strong shine.

== Statues in North Korea ==
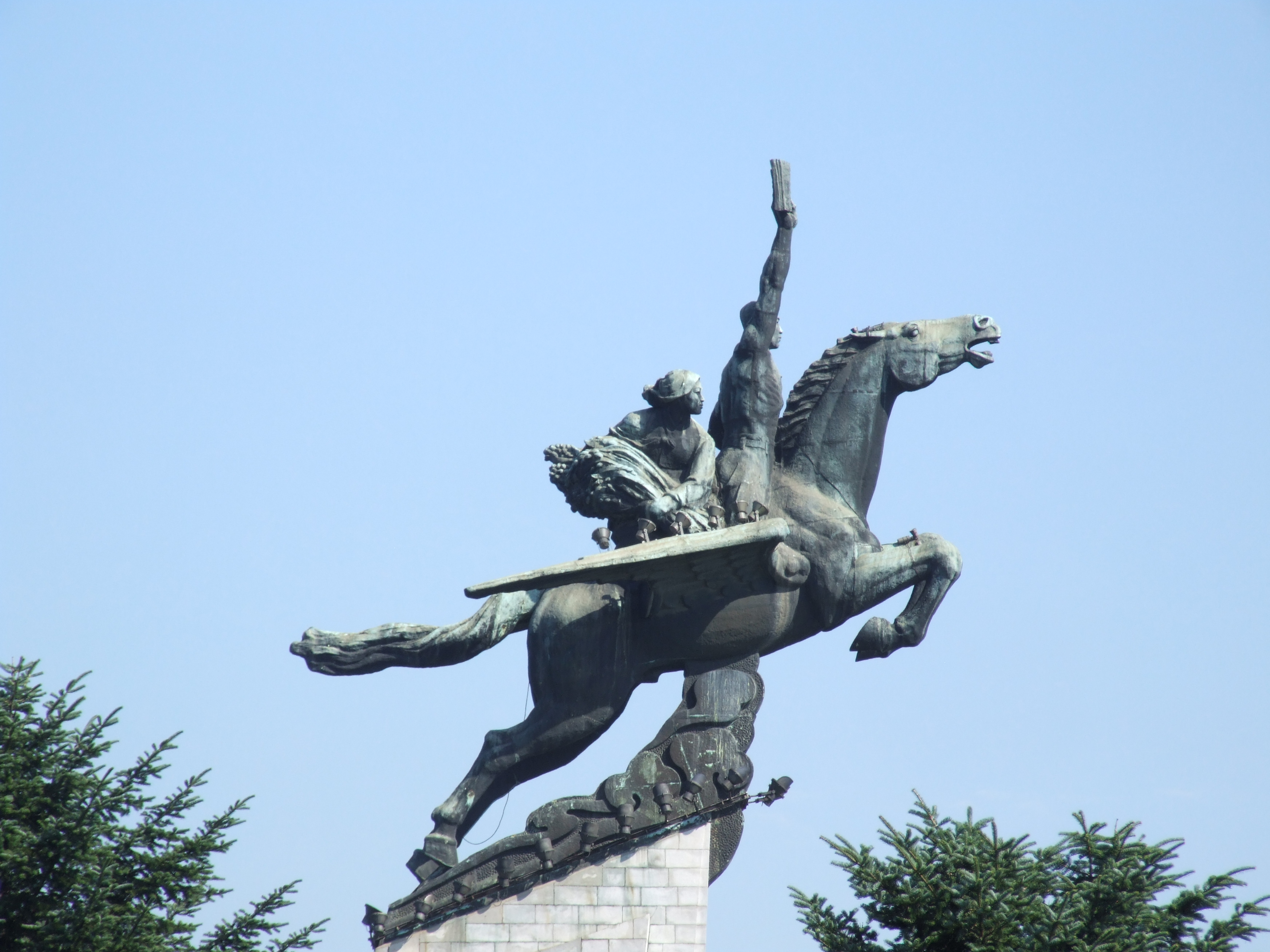
Chollima statue at the foot of Mansu Hill

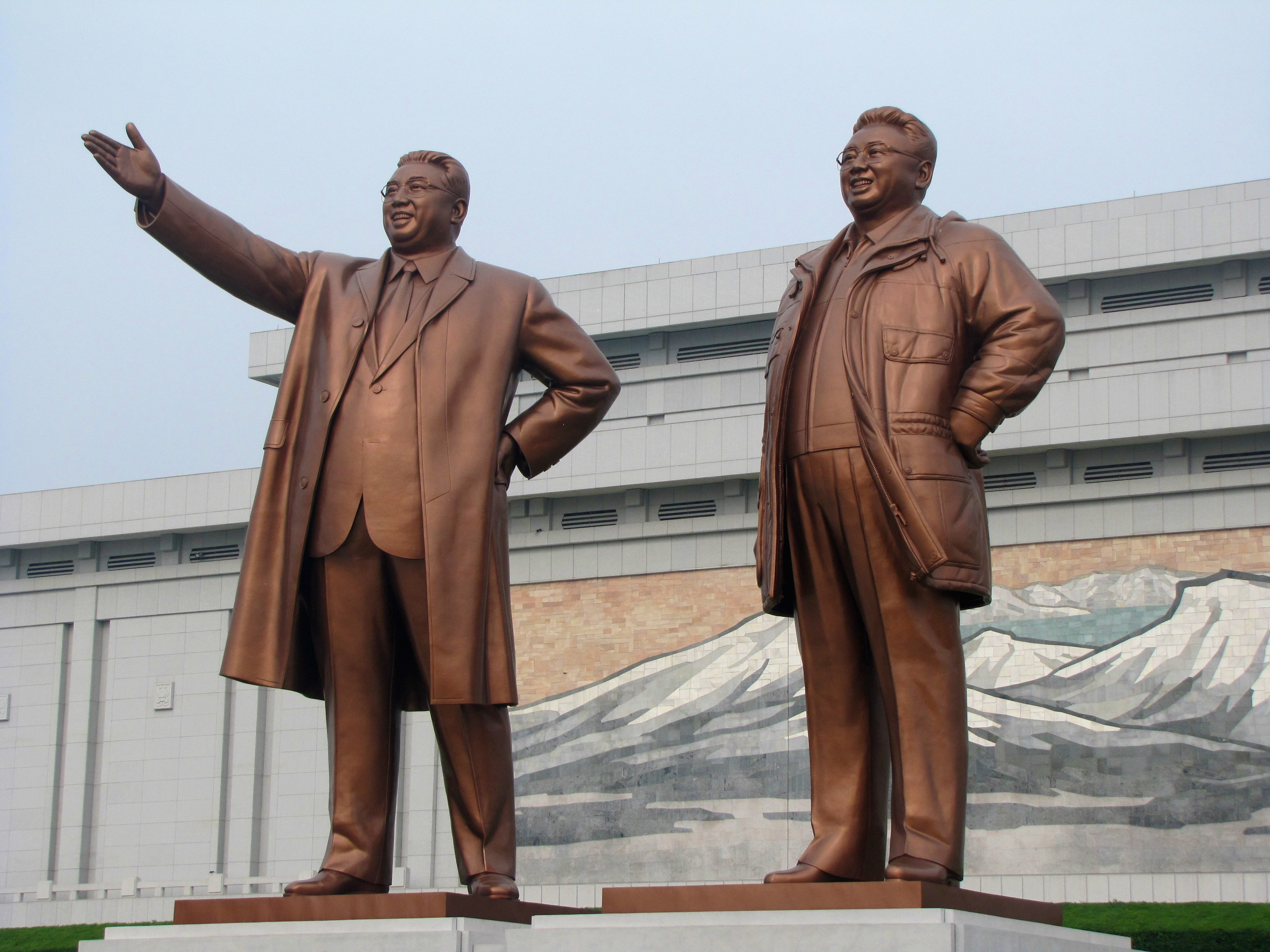
Bronze statues of Kim Il-sung and Kim Jong-il at Mansu Hill Grand Monument

Mansudae Art Studio has created statues and sculptures that have been placed all over the country, with three of the most important and famous works being the Chollima statue, the Monument to the Founding of the Korean Workers Party, and the bronze statues of Kim Il Sung and Kim Jong Il at the Mansu Hill Grand Monument. These monuments are common tourist destinations, and the statues of the deceased Kims are on most North Korean travel itineraries.

Built in 1961, the Chollima statue, which has a replica at the Mansudae Art Museum in Beijing, is a depiction of a legendary winged horse that could fly a thousand li (about 300 miles) a day. The horse has a male worker and a female peasant riding on its back, "symbolizing the heroic spirit of the Korean People" and heading into North Korea's future.

Built in 1995 to commemorate the 50th anniversary of the North Korean Workers Party, the Monument to the Founding of the Korean Workers Party is 164 feet tall and depicts three "truck-size" fists holding a hammer, a sickle, and a calligraphy brush respectively.

The Mansu Hill Grand Monument is perhaps the most well-known image used to represent North Korea. The monument includes two bronze statues that are 20 meters tall, making them the largest statues in the country. The monument has changed over time, as it began with just one statue of Kim Il Sung and was dedicated to him on his 60th birthday in 1972. In 2012, a statue of Kim Jong Il was added, only to be recast a few months later to change the statue's overcoat with a parka in honor of the anorak Kim Jong Il was commonly seen wearing throughout his life, which was labeled a "witness of history" upon his death and was talked about with much emotion.

== Mansudae Overseas Project Group ==
Mansudae Art Studio has an international division, the Mansudae Overseas Project Group, which was established in 1970s. This division is a thriving multimillion-dollar business that has created monuments, museums, stadiums, and palaces for several countries, including Algeria, Botswana, Cambodia, Chad, the Democratic Republic of the Congo, Egypt, Ethiopia, Germany, Malaysia, Mozambique, Madagascar, Senegal, the Syrian Arab Republic, Togo, and Zimbabwe. According to Pier Luigi Cecioni, the success of this small cottage industry is due to Mansudae's "competence and experience to realize such huge projects, and it can send large teams of artists and workers to foreign countries for a long time." Preliminary work is done at the Mansudae Art Studio, and designs are tested to determine resistance to natural disasters. Some believe that the group has "no competition worldwide," as one Mansudae sculptor told a German publication.

=== Fairy Tale Fountain ===
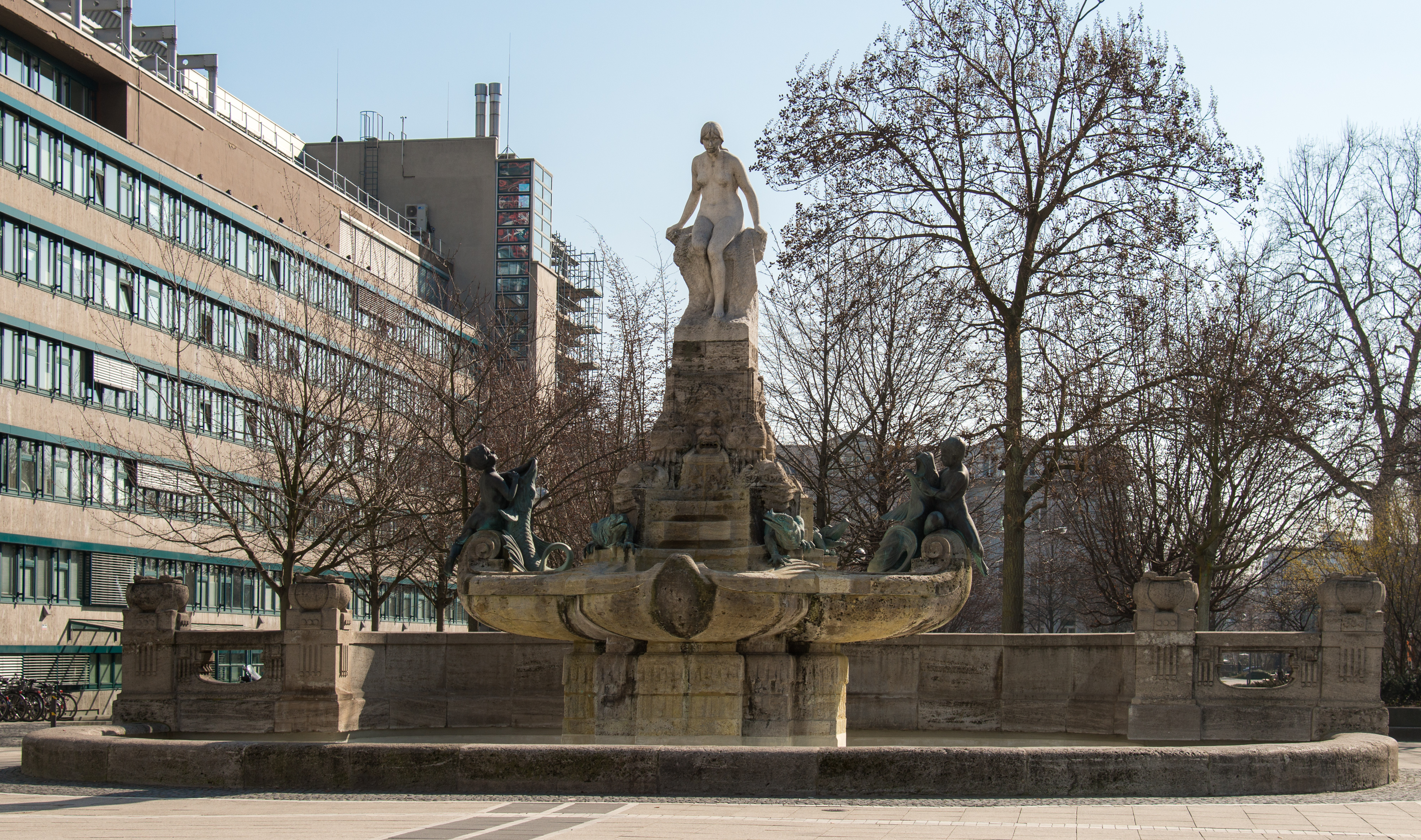
Frankfurt's Fairy Tale Fountain

In 2004, Klaus Klemp, deputy director of Frankfurt's Museum of Applied Art, discovered and was impressed by Mansudae's craftsmanship. Klemp convinced Frankfurt's officials to hire the Mansudae Overseas Project Group to reconstruct Fairy Tale Fountain, an "art nouveau relic from 1910 that had been melted down for its metal during World War II" for which the original blueprints had gone missing. The Project Group was chosen for its early 1900s style, ability to recreate the fountain based on old photographs, and attractive prices. The fountain is the only commission that the group has won from a Western country.

=== African Renaissance Monument ===
Perhaps the group's most notable monument is also one of its most controversial: Senegal's African Renaissance Monument. Unveiled in 2010, it stands at 50 meters, which is taller than the Statue of Liberty and Rio de Janeiro's Christ the Redeemer, and depicts a half-nude African family of three in a socialist-realist pose. A former president of Senegal, Abdoulaye Wade, hired the group because it was the only organization that he could afford. It took the work of around 150 Mansudae artists to complete. Senegalese unions protested about the foreign labour due to the 50 per cent unemployment rate at the time, the Muslim majority of the population was offended by the exposed breast of the mother figure, and Wade had to have the heads redone as they looked Korean rather than African.

== Significance ==
Mansudae Art Studio may be the largest art factory in the world. The studio is extremely important in North Korea as it employs the best artists and is the only organization "officially sanctioned to portray the Kim family dynasty." Positions at Mansudae are prestigious and desirable, especially as part of the Overseas Project Group. Mansudae workers sent overseas live under strict security, but they are fed regularly and earn better wages than most North Koreans. Since its founding in 1959, Mansudae has reproduced, reflected, and shaped the country's aesthetic. North Korea "spends much of its budget on Kim family deification," which likely includes and thus funds Mansudae, as the studio produces propaganda ranging from monuments to the party to the Kim pins worn by all North Koreans. Mansudae's propaganda output is essential to the North Korean government. According to Pier Luigi Cecioni, the studio is so important to the country and its government that it "has the status of a ministry [and] is not subject to the Ministry of Culture."

== See also ==
- Chosŏnhwa
- Culture of North Korea
- Mansudae Overseas Projects
- Mansudae Art Theatre
