= Korean Revolution Museum =

- 조선혁명박물관
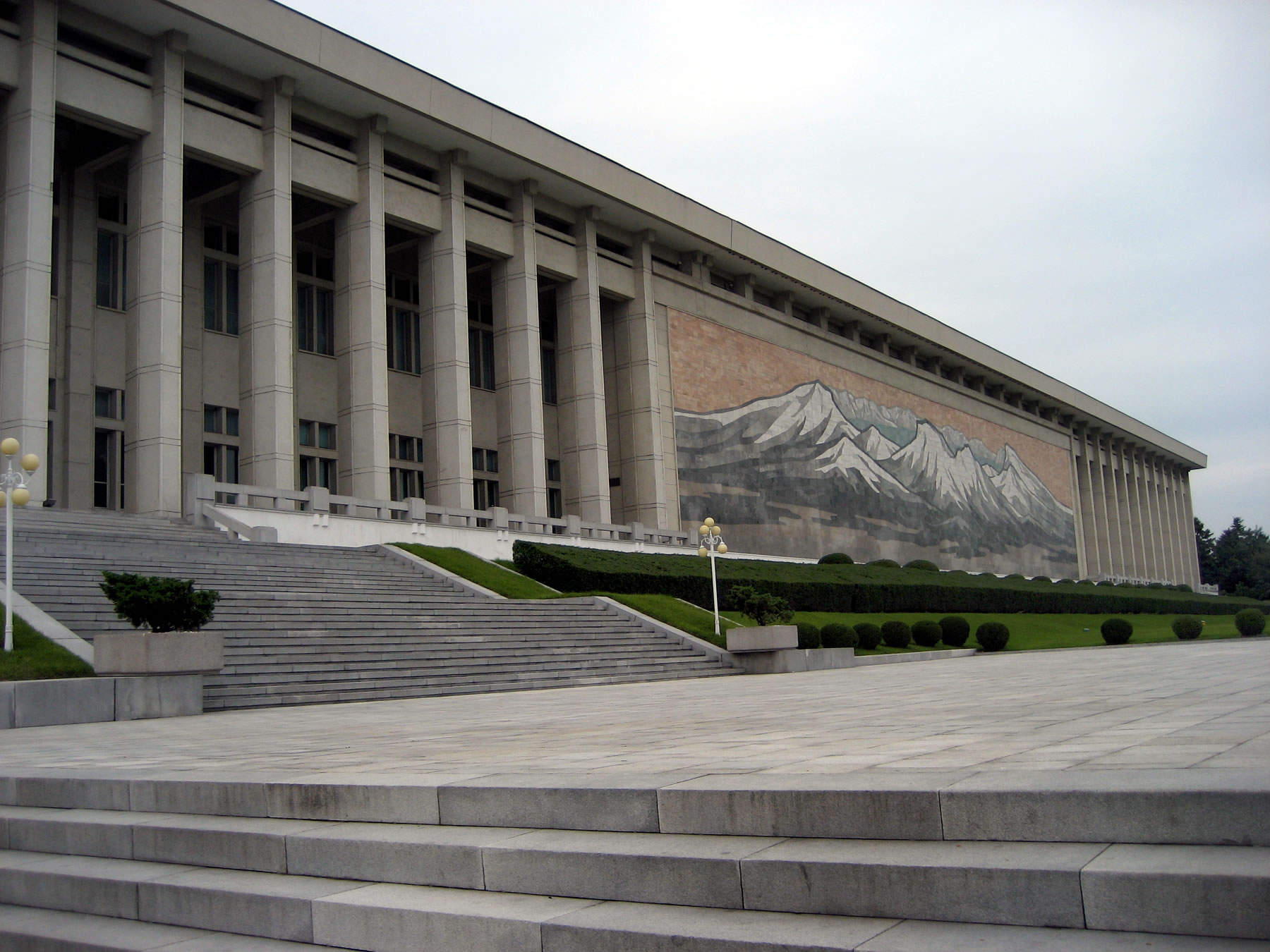
- Main entrance of the museum on Mansudae Hill
- Established: 1 August 1948
- Location: Pyongyang, North Korea
- Coordinates: 39°01′56″N 125°45′07″E
- Type: History museum
- Visitors: 27 million since 1948
- Public transit access: Chŏllima: T'ongil

The Korean Revolution Museum (Korean: 조선혁명박물관), located in Pyongyang, North Korea, was founded on August 1, 1948, and holds a large exhibition of items related to Kim Il Sung and the Korean revolutionary movement. The building's back façade faces the Mansu Hill Grand Monument and it is adjacent to the Mansudae Assembly Hall, seat of the Supreme People's Assembly, the North Korean legislature.

The Korean Revolution Museum encompasses the period between 1860 and the present day, including the anti-Japanese resistance, the Korean War and the period of socialist construction. It has 90 rooms which hold items related to Kim Il Sung and his associates, the Korean diaspora, and various historical battles. Since its establishment, it has had 27 million visitors from North Korea and abroad. At 240,000 square metres, it is also one of the largest structures in the world. From 2011 to 2012, renovations included a new floor being built. The museum underwent major renovations which were completed in 2017. A new exhibition hall was opened in 2022 to mark the 10th anniversary of Kim Jong Un's rise to power.

== See also ==
- List of museums in North Korea
