= Korean Art Gallery =

Coordinates: 39°01′N 125°45′E

- 조선미술박물관
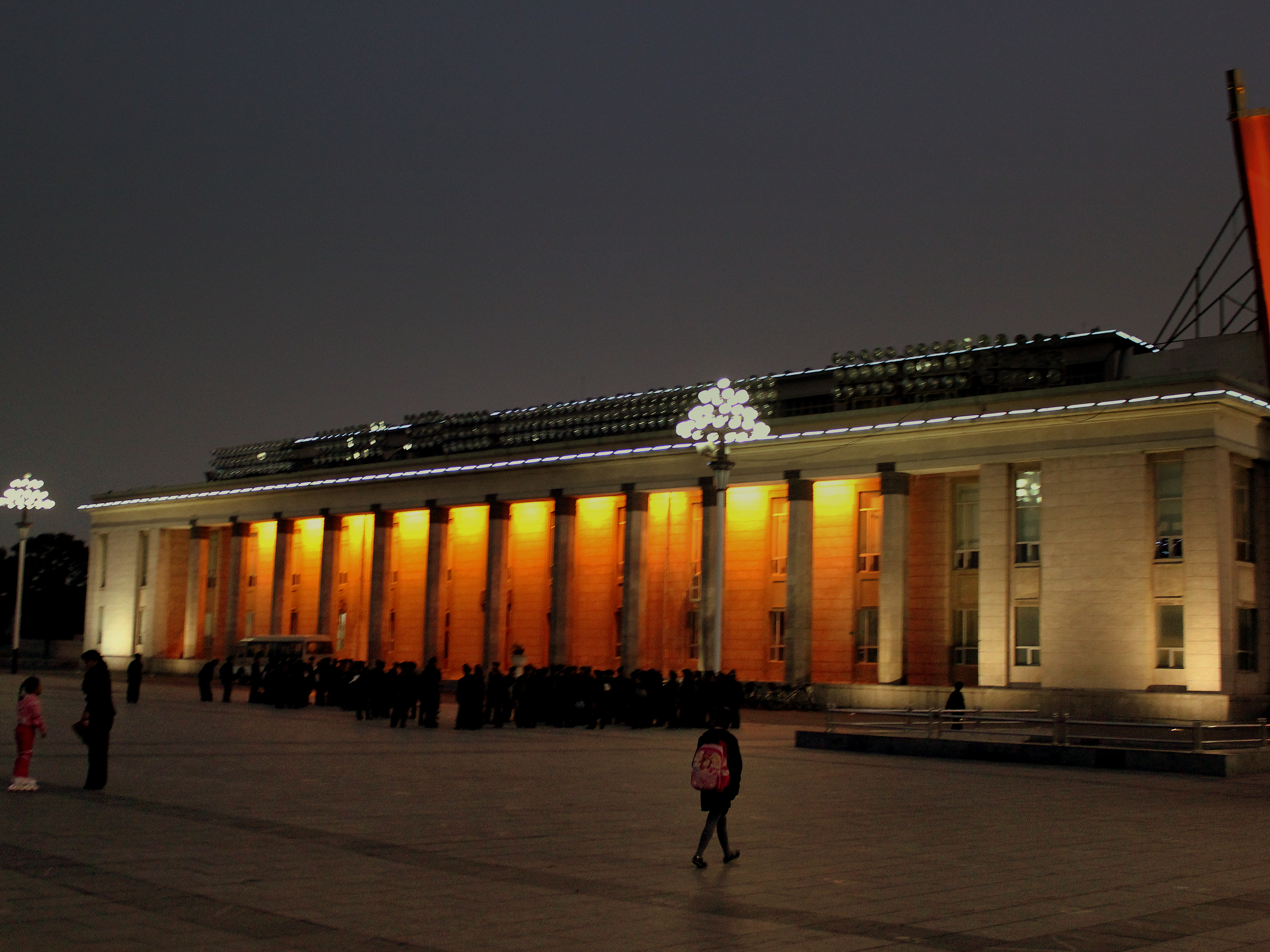
- Korean Art Gallery (2012)
- Established: 11 August 1948
- Location: Pyongyang, North Korea
- Type: Art museum

- Korean Art Gallery
- Chosŏn'gŭl: 조선미술박물관
- Hancha: 朝鮮美術博物館
- Revised Romanization: Joseon misul bangmulgwan
- McCune–Reischauer: Chosŏn misul pangmulgwan

The Korean Art Gallery (Korean: 조선미술박물관) is an art museum situated on the south side of Kim Il-sung Square in Chung-guyok, Pyongyang, North Korea, which opened in 1948.

The building is 4 stories tall with 22 display rooms, an exhibition hall, a room for preservation of works and an artworks study room that exhibits a wide range of art, including oil painting, print, sculpture and industrial arts.

== History ==
The Korean Art Gallery first opened on 11 August 1948, and was later reconstructed in 2010. As of 2020, over 6 million people have visited the museum.

== Layout ==
The museum has 22 showrooms, an exhibition hall, several preservation rooms, and a study room. The Museum has over 10,000 square metres (110,000 ft^{2}) of floor space and hosts several different styles of art pieces including Korean paintings, oil paintings, sculptures and embroideries. There are also tomb murals before the 4th century.

== See also ==
- List of museums in North Korea
