= History of the Workers' Party of Korea =

Aspect of North Korean political history

The history of the Workers' Party of Korea (WPK) encompasses the period from 1949 onwards.

== Founding ==
According to North Korean sources, the origins of the Workers' Party of Korea can be traced to the Down-with-Imperialism Union, which was supposedly founded on October 17, 1926 and led by Kim Il Sung, then 14 years old. It is described in these sources as "the first genuine revolutionary communist organization in Korea." The Workers' Party of North Korea was formed on 29 August 1946 from a merger between the Communist Party of North Korea and the New People's Party of Korea (조선신민당).

On June 24, 1949, the Workers Party of North Korea and the Workers' Party of South Korea merged, forming the Workers' Party of Korea, at a congress in Pyongyang. Both parties traced their origins to the Communist Party of Korea. Kim Il Sung of the Workers Party of North Korea became the party Chairman and Pak Hon-yong, who had been leader of the Workers Party of South Korea as well as the earlier Communist Party of Korea, and Ho Ka-i becoming deputy chairmen. There were a total of ten members of the first DPRK Politburo. The other members were Yi Sung-yop, Kim Sam-yong, Kim Chaek, Kim Tu-bong, Pak Il-u, and Pak Chong-ae. Most were later purged by Kim Il Sung.

However, official North Korean sources consider October 10, 1945 as the 'Party Foundation Day', citing a founding meeting of the 'North Korea Bureau of the Communist Party of Korea' founded under Soviet guidance. Foreign historians, however, dispute that date and claim that the meeting was in fact held on October 13. The party considers itself as a direct continuation of the North Korea Bureau and the Workers Party of North Korea, considering the two congresses of the Workers Party of North Korea as its own. This version of events can be seen as a move to downplay the importance of the communists from South Korea, who were purged in the 1950s.

The first five years of the WPK's rule were dominated by the Korean War. By October 1950, United Nations forces had occupied most of the DPRK and the WPK leadership had to flee to China. Many believe that if it had not been for Chinese intervention, the Korean communists would have been militarily defeated at that point. But in November, Chinese forces entered the war and threw the U.N. forces back, retaking Pyongyang in December and Seoul in January 1951. In March U.N. forces retook Seoul, and the front was stabilised along what eventually became the permanent "Armistice Line" of 1953. The WPK was able to re-establish its rule north of this line.

== Education of new state apparatus ==
In preparing to build the party-state according to the tradition in other states of the communist bloc, Kim Il Sung quoted Joseph Stalin's statement that "cadres decide everything", and thrust the cadre policy into the forefront of issues needing attention. The first problem was that trained workers were in extraordinarily short supply. Kim himself realized the severity of this problem, saying in June 1946 that "If we have about 500 trained cadres, then we can dispatch one hundred to each of the five provinces to solve the shortage problem. But, we do not have such trained cadres".

Accordingly, he started to establish schools for the educating of bureaucrats who would be appointed to the party military and cabinet. In February 1946, Pyongyang Institute opened its doors to students who would soon become relatively high-ranking military leaders, and three months later, the Training Institute for Security Officers and the Central Party School began educating military officers and party cadres respectively.

== Factions ==
As the Workers' Party of Korea, and its two founding parties, had emerged through a series of mergers, it contained various competing factions. At the time of its foundation, the party was made up of four factions, the Soviet Koreans faction, the Domestic faction, the Yanan (or Chinese) faction and the Guerrilla faction.

- The Soviet Koreans, led first by Alexei Ivanovich Hegay and then by Pak Chang Ok were made up of waves of ethnic Koreans who were born or raised in Russia after their families moved there starting in the 1870s. Some of them had returned to Korea covertly as Communist operatives in the twenties and thirties but most were members of the Red Army or civilians who were stationed in North Korea following World War II to help the Red Army establish a Soviet satellite. Many came as translators or as Russian language instructors.
- The Domestic faction, led by Pak Hon-yong were Korean Communists who never left the country but engaged in a struggle against the Japanese occupation. Many members of the domestic faction had spent time in Japanese military prisons as a result of their activities. They were the ones who agitated that the Korean People's Army take the lead in national reunification through military means.
- The Yanan faction, led first by Mu Chong and then by Kim Tu-bong and Choe Chang-ik, were those Korean exiles who had lived in China's Shaanxi province and joined the Chinese Communist Party whose regional headquarters were at Yan'an. They had formed their own party, the North-Chinese League for the Independence of Korea, and when they returned to North Korea from exile they formed the New People's Party which merged with the North Korean Bureau to form the Workers Party of North Korea. Many members of the Yanan faction had fought in the Chinese 8th and New 4th Armies and thus had close relations with Mao Zedong.
- The Guerrilla faction, led by Kim Il Sung, was made up of former Korean guerillas who had been active in Manchuria after it was occupied by Japan in 1931. Many in this group ended up fleeing Manchuria, as their armed resistance was suppressed, and moved to the Soviet Union where many of them, including Kim, were drafted into the Red Army.

Once the WPK was created there was a virtual parity between the four factions with the Yanan, Soviet and Domestic factions each having four representatives on the Politburo with the Guerrilla faction having three.

In the early years of the party, Kim Il Sung was the acknowledged leader, but he did not yet have absolute power, since it was necessary to balance off the interests of the various factions. To eliminate any threats to his position, he first moved against individual leaders who were potential rivals. He drove from power Alexei Ivanovich Hegay (also known as Hŏ Ka-i), leader of the Soviet faction, first demoting him during the Korean War in 1951 and then using him as a scapegoat for slow repairs of a water reservoir bombed by the Americans to drive him from power (and to an alleged suicide) in 1953. In part, it was possible for Kim to do this because the intervention of "Chinese People's Volunteers" in the war reduced the influence of both the USSR and the Soviet faction and allowed Kim Il Sung the room he needed to dispose of his main rival.

Kim Il Sung also attacked the leadership of the Yanan faction. When the North Koreans were driven to the Chinese border, Kim Il Sung needed a scapegoat to explain the military disaster and blamed Mu Chong, a leader of the Yanan faction and also a leader of the North Korean military. Mu Chong and a number of other military leaders were expelled from the party and Mu was forced to return to China where he spent the rest of his life. Kim Il Sung also removed Pak Il-u, the Minister of the Interior and reputedly the personal representative of Mao Zedong.

The sacking of Hegay, Mu and Pak reduced the influence of the Chinese and Soviet factions, but Kim Il Sung could not yet launch an all-out assault on these factions because he would risk the intervention of Moscow and Beijing when he was still dependent on their support.

== Purge of the "Domestic faction" ==
As the Korean War drew to a close, Kim Il Sung first moved against the Domestic faction. While the Soviet faction had the sponsorship of the Soviet Union, and the Yanan faction was backed by China, the Domestic faction had no external sponsor who would come to their aid, and was therefore in the weakest position. With the end of the Korean War, the usefulness of the Domestic faction in running guerilla and spy networks in South Korea came to an end. Former leaders of the Workers Party of South Korea were attacked at a December 1952 Central Committee meeting. In early 1953, rumours were spread that the "southerners" had been planning a coup. This led to the arrest and removal from power of Pak Hon-yong (who was foreign minister at the time) and Yi Sung Yop the minister of "state control" who was charged with "spying on behalf of the United States". In August 1953, following the signing of the armistice that suspended the Korean War, Yi and eleven other leaders of the domestic faction were subjected to a show trial on charges of planning a military coup and sentenced to death. In 1955, Pak Hon-yong, the former leader of the WPSK and deputy chairman of the WPK, was put on trial on charges of having been a US agent since 1939, sabotage, assassination, and planning a coup. He was sentenced to death, although it is unclear if he was shot immediately or if his execution occurred some time in 1956.

The trials of Yi and Pak were accompanied by the arrest of other members and activists of the former SWPK, with defendants being executed or sent to forced labour in the countryside. The domestic faction was virtually wiped out, though a few individual members who had personally allied themselves to Kim Il Sung remained in positions of influence for several more years.

== The "August incident" and aftermath ==
Kim Il Sung sent out preliminary signals in late 1955 and early 1956 that he was preparing to move against the Yanan and Soviet factions. The Twentieth Party Congress of the Soviet Communist Party was a bombshell with Nikita Khrushchev's Secret Speech denouncing Joseph Stalin and the inauguration of destalinisation. Throughout the Soviet bloc domestic Communist parties inaugurated campaigns against personality cults and the general secretaries who modelled themselves after Stalin were deposed throughout Eastern Europe.

Kim Il Sung was summoned to Moscow for six weeks in the summer of 1956 in order to receive a dressing down from Khrushchev, who wished to bring North Korea in line with the new orthodoxy. During Kim Il Sung's absence, Pak Chang Ok (the new leader of the Soviet faction after the suicide of Ho Ka Ai), Choe Chang Ik, and other leading members of the Yanan faction devised a plan to attack Kim Il Sung at the next plenum of the Central Committee and criticise him for not "correcting" his leadership methods, developing a personality cult, distorting the "Leninist principle of collective leadership" his "distortions of socialist legality" (i.e. using arbitrary arrest and executions) and use other Khrushchev-era criticisms of Stalinism against Kim Il Sung's leadership.

Kim Il Sung became aware of the plan upon his return from Moscow and responded by delaying the plenum by almost a month and using the additional time to prepare by bribing and coercing Central Committee members and planning a stage-managed response. When the plenum finally opened on August 30 Choe Chang-ik made a speech attacking Kim Il Sung for concentrating the power of the party and the state in his own hands as well as criticising the party line on industrialisation which ignored widespread starvation among the North Korean people. Yun Kong Hum attacked Kim Il Sung for creating a "police regime". Kim Il Sung's supporters heckled and berated the speakers rendering them almost inaudible and destroying their ability to persuade members. Kim Il Sung's supporters accused the opposition of being "anti-Party" and moved to expel Yun from the party. Kim Il Sung, in response, neutralised the attack on him by promising to inaugurate changes and moderate the regime, promises which were never kept. The majority in the committee voted to support Kim Il Sung and also voted in favour of repressing the opposition, expelling Choe and Pak from the Central Committee.

Several leaders of the Yunan faction fled to China to escape the purges that followed the August plenum, while supporters of the Soviet faction and Yanan faction were rounded up. Though Kim Tu Bong, the leader of the Yanan faction and nominal President of North Korea, was not directly involved in the attempt on Kim, he was ultimately purged in 1958, accused of being the "mastermind" of the plot. Kim Tu Bong "disappeared" after his removal from power, and likely was either executed or died in prison.

In September 1956, a joint Soviet-Chinese delegation went to Pyongyang to "instruct" Kim Il Sung to cease any purge and reinstate the leaders of the Yanan and Soviet factions. A second plenum of the Central Committee, held on September 23, 1956, officially pardoned the leaders of the August opposition attempt and rehabilitated them, but in 1957 the purges resumed, and, by 1958, the Yanan faction had ceased to exist. Members of the Soviet faction, meanwhile, facing increased harassment, decided to return to the Soviet Union in increasing numbers. By 1961, the only faction left was Kim Il Sung's own guerrilla faction, along with members who had joined the WPK under Kim Il Sung's leadership and were loyal to him. In the 1961 Central Committee, there were only two members of the Soviet faction, three members of the Yanan faction and three members of the Domestic faction left out of a total Central Committee membership of 68. These individuals were personally loyal to Kim Il Sung and were trusted by him; however, by the late 1960s, even these individuals were almost all purged.

One likely reason for the failure of the Soviet and Yanan factions to depose Kim Il Sung was the nationalist view by younger members of the party who had joined since 1950 that the members of these factions were "foreigners" influenced by alien powers while Kim Il Sung was seen as a true Korean.

According to Kim Il Sung’s biographer, Dae sook suh: "His (Kim’s) long struggle to consolidate power was complete... There were no longer any factions to challenge his position, and, for the first time, no foreign armed forces were occupying the North".

== The Sino-Soviet Split ==
Until the 1960s, the regime in the DPRK was seen as an orthodox Communist one-party state, with power residing in the Communist Party. All industry was nationalised and all agriculture was collectivised on the Soviet model, and the party controlled this command economy at every level. All other political organisation was suppressed and civil society was extinguished. A pervasive political police apparatus suppressed all dissent. Even at this stage, there was a personality cult of Kim Il Sung, but it was usually assumed in the West that the DPRK was a Soviet satellite like Poland or East Germany though, in reality, this had stopped being the case after 1956.

The Sino-Soviet split helped Kim Il Sung take the Workers' Party of Korea on an independent path between Moscow and Beijing. The party and Kim Il Sung in particular were wary of de-stalinization and of Khrushchev's reforms. In the late 1950s, the DPRK began to increasingly emulate the People's Republic of China (PRC), launching its own version of the Great Leap Forward calling it the Chollima movement. The press did not mention the Sino-Soviet split at first. In 1961, Kim Il Sung signed a treaty of friendship and mutual cooperation with Zhou Enlai and then proceeded to sign a similar treaty with the Soviet Union. After 1962 and particularly after the Twenty-Second CPSU Party Congress in which Soviet leaders criticised Chinese leaders, the WPK began to side openly with the PRC not only on issues such as the personality cult and anti-revisionism but also against Khrushchev's theory of peaceful coexistence. Editorials began to appear in the press openly criticising the Soviet position and defending the Chinese and obliquely attacking Khrushchev. The WPK supported the PRC during its conflict with India in 1962 and denounced the USSR's "capitulation" in the Cuban Missile Crisis.

The Soviet Union responded by cutting off all aid to the DPRK, seriously damaging North Korea's industry and military capability. PRC did not have the resources to replace the Soviet aid and, after 1965, was embroiled in the chaos of the Cultural Revolution. Events in PRC shocked the WPK leadership and caused it to distance itself from PRC and criticise Mao's "dogmatism" and recklessness, even accusing the Chinese of adopting the "Trotskyist theory of permanent revolution", a serious heresy in the Communist world. The Chinese Red Guards began to attack Kim Il Sung and Korean domestic and foreign policy. After 1965, North Korea took a neutral stand in the Sino-Soviet conflict, backing away from its previous uncritical support of PRC.

Although Kim Il Sung's regime emulated some of the slogans of the Mao Zedong's Cultural Revolution, Kim Il Sung remained wary of Chinese domination and never applied anything like the Cultural Revolution in North Korea. In the same year, DPRK forces captured the U.S.S. Pueblo, an American spy ship, showing that Kim Il Sung was running his own version of the Cold War, independent of Soviet or Chinese tutelage.

== Juche and Kim Il-sung as supreme leader ==
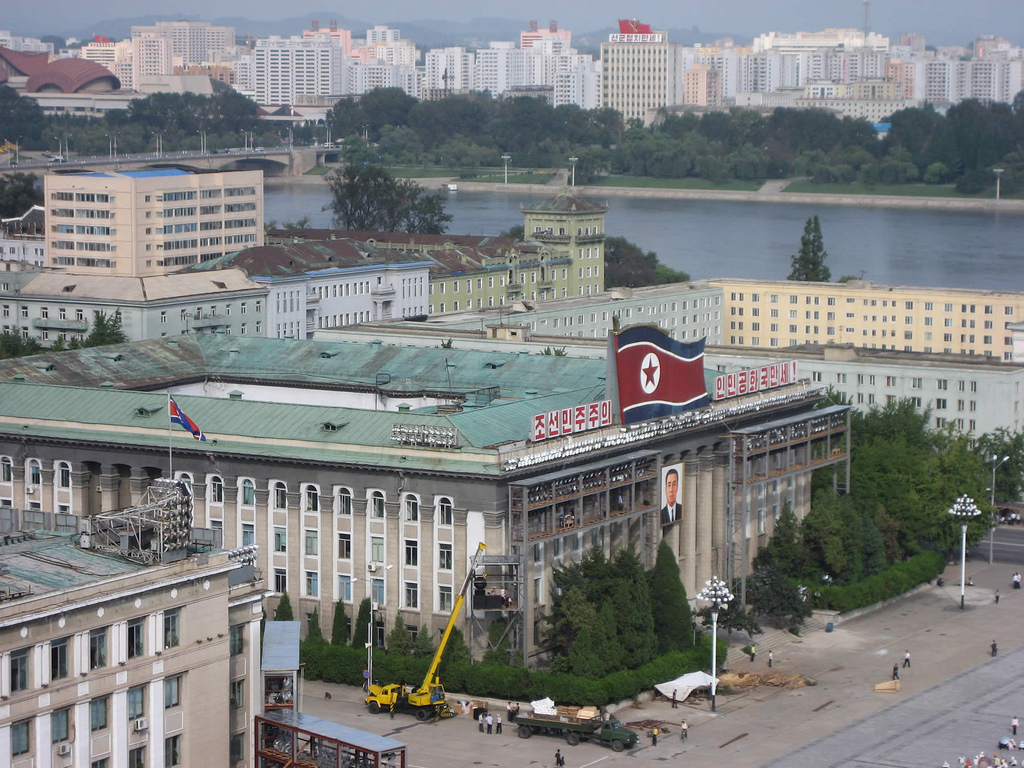
Party headquarters in Kim Il-sung Square, Pyongyang

After 1956, Kim Il Sung was no longer a Soviet puppet and the DPRK moved away from being a Soviet satellite or "people's democracy". Nor did he trust the Chinese due to their suspected support of the Yanan faction's move against Kim Il Sung. Rather, he pursued an independent policy and initiated his Juche program of national self-reliance in order to diminish the influence of the USSR and China over domestic North Korean affairs. The program was officially launched in June 1966 (after the state visit of the Soviet Foreign Minister) as the program of national self-determination and Communist and Workers' Parties' non-interference. By the late 1960s, the North Korean media was hailing the Juche ideology as being superior to Leninism and other foreign ideologies and "burning loyalty" to the "Great Leader" became a major ideological theme (the term "Great Leader" was first used in the early 1960s) and took the Stalinistic practice of the personality cult to new levels.

With the removal of the other factions, Kim Il Sung became the supreme leader of the DPRK. By 1960, Kim Il Sung had purged virtually all the members of the Yanan, Domestic, and Soviet factions through show trials, intimidation, and encouraging Soviet Koreans to return to the USSR, leaving the party to be dominated by his "guerrilla comrades" as well as young technocrats who had joined the party after its founding and were loyal to Kim Il Sung.

In 1972, the DPRK adopted a new constitution, under which an executive presidency was created, and Kim Il Sung became President as well as the WPK's General Secretary. Thereafter, Kim Il Sung's personality cult reached heights that made even Stalin and Mao appear modest by comparison. Kim Il Sung was credited with personal direction of every supposed achievement of the regime, his biography was rewritten to make him the founder and leader of the WPK from its inception, and a new ideology of Kim Il Sung's creation, Juche or self-reliance, replaced Marxism–Leninism as the regime's official ideology. All other WPK leaders remained completely anonymous, although Kim Il Sung's power in fact depended on the control of the Korean People's Army and the security forces by his loyal agent, Defence Minister Oh Jin-wu. Kim Jong Il explains in Socialism of Our Country is Socialism of Our Style as the Embodiment of the Juche Idea, a speech made to the central committee of the WPK on December 27, 1990, the divorce with Marxism–Leninism. "We could not literally accept the Marxist theory which had been advanced on the premises of the socio-historic conditions of the developed European capitalist countries, or the Leninist theory presented in the situation of Russia where capitalism was developed to the second grade. We had had to find a solution to every problem arising in the revolution ... from the standpoint of Juche".

The practical effect of Juche was to seal the DPRK off from virtually all foreign trade, except to a limited extent with China and the Soviet Union. But, the economic reforms of Deng Xiaoping in China after 1978 meant that trade with the undeveloped centrally-planned economy of the DPRK held decreasing interest for China, while the fall of communism in the Soviet Union in 1991 completed the DPRK's isolation. This, added to the continuing high level of expenditure on armaments, led to a steadily mounting economic crisis from the 1980s onwards.

== The rise of Kim Jong-il ==
Kim Jong Il had been groomed to become his father's successor for a long time. In 1964, he was appointed Central Committee member, then promoted to Politburo member and designated successor to Kim Il Sung in 1974 by a Central Committee plenum.

After Kim Jong Il assumed the position of party secretary in charge of organization and propaganda in September 1973, his involvement in party affairs enhanced their organizational strength and discipline. With his elevated position in the party, Kim Jong Il rigidly implemented two policies: an enhancement of the role of full-time party cadres in local and administrative units and a strengthening of party-life criticism in every unit of the workplace as well as in the party. This establishment of a strong disciplinary tradition in the party contributed to the maintenance of social control. It has become an important foundation for the persistence of the existing authority structure centered on the father and the son.

In 1980, the WPK Congress elevated Kim Jong Il to senior positions and publicized his status as heir apparent. Until then, it seemed likely that Kim's successor would be either Oh Jin-wu or Prime Minister Kim Il (not related to Kim Il Sung). In fact, it seems that Kim Il Sung had always planned that his son would succeed him, and had been advancing him within the Army (the real source of power in the DPRK) since 1974. Kim Il was removed from office in 1976 and died in 1984, and Oh remained loyal to the Kim family. Well before Kim Il Sung's death in 1994, Kim Jong Il had become the day-to-day ruler of the country, and had promoted his own followers to key positions in the Army. Kim Jong Il's accession was followed by a round of purges in the WPK, in which some of his father's old followers were removed from office.

=== The 6th Party Congress and the party's decline ===
WPK congresses and plenums became less and less frequent, and their deliberations less and less substantive. Part of the reason for the “subservience” of the delegates appears to be the significant turnover between congresses: between 41 and 72 percent of the members of Central Committees selected at each party congress were new to their positions.

Despite the almighty status and power of the WPK, it has never functioned according to regulations, a fact that became even worse after Kim Il-Sung's death. A party congress has not been held since the sixth party congress in 1980. According to the Party Rules, a party congress is supposed to be held every five years. The plenum of the Central Committee has not been held since the 21st Plenum in December 1993. The plenum, which has the right to elect the General Secretary, was not held even when Kim Jong Il became the party's general secretary in October 1997. Instead Kim Jong Il was endorsed by both the Central Committee and the Central Military Commission on ground of petitions and letters from lower organizations. For the first time in the history of Workers' Party of Korea, a plenum also was not held before the first session of newly elected SPAs. It is also suspected that Secretariat has not held a meeting since Kim Il Sung's death, while the last known Politburo meeting before 2010 was held in 1994.

In the wake of the revision of the constitution in 1998, making the National Defense Commission the highest state body, there had been a dramatic reshuffling of the official leadership rankings. The elevation of the NDC to preeminent status placed Kim’s unique stamp on the North Korean regime through the creation of a quasi-wartime crisis management system.

=== 2007–2010 ===
The Party was given new prominence starting from 2007–2008: in 2007, the Administration Department was re-established with Chang Song-taek as director, and in 2009 Choe Yong-rim was appointed chief secretary of the Pyongyang Party Committee filling a 9-year vacancy.

In 2009, South Korea’s government released the latest constitution of North Korea which codified the prevailing ideology of party and government. It omitted all mention of communism. A press representative also explained to South Korean officials that communism is not considered viable "as long as U.S. imperialism exists".

=== The 2010 Party Conference ===
On 26 June 2010, the Party Politburo called the 3rd Party Conference for early September; after an unexplained delay, the Conference was held on 28 September; it re-elected Kim Jong Il as Party General Secretary, renewed the Party Central Committee with Kim Jong Il's son Kim Jong Un as member, and adopted new Party Rules which eliminated the clause that a party congress must be convened every 5 years, increased the power of the Central Military Commission, and inserted a praise to Kim Jong Il in the preface.

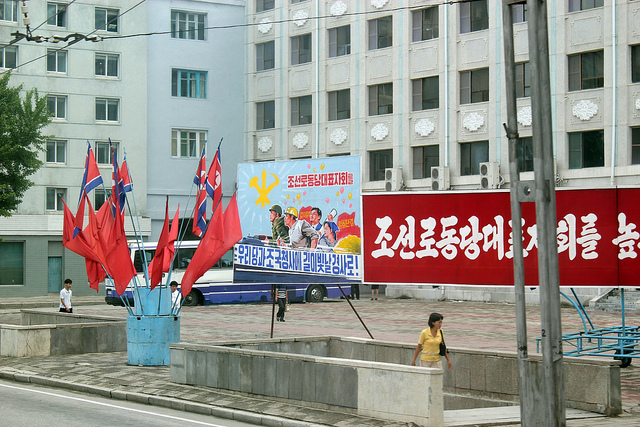
August 2010 Pyongyang propaganda proclaims "Greet the conference of the Workers' Party of Korea as an auspicious event which will shine forever in the history of our party and country!"

On 28 September 2010, a Central Committee plenum (the first after 17 years) was held as well, renewing central authorities and appointing Kim Jong Un a vice-chairman of the Central Military Commission.

On 6 June 2011, North Korean press publicized a Politburo enlarged meeting, the first of this kind since the 1980s. The meeting was almost entirely focused on Kim Jong Il's recent visit to the People's Republic of China, adding further speculation on China's endorsement of Kim Jong Il's succession as well as signalling the DPRK's increasing interest for Chinese economic reforms.

=== The rise of Kim Jong-un ===
After Kim Jong Il died on 17 December 2011, North Korean elites moved to consolidate Kim Jong Un's position. He was declared to be in charge of the country as soon as the official report on Kim Jong Il's death was published on 19 December. On 26 December 2011, the official newspaper Rodong Sinmun hailed him as supreme leader of the party and the state. On 30 December, a meeting of the Politburo officially appointed him Supreme Commander of the Korean People's Army, after he was allegedly nominated for the position by Kim Jong Il himself in October 2011 (the anniversary of Kim Jong Il's assumption of general-secretaryship).

Despite being not even a Politburo member, Kim Jong Un was nevertheless proclaimed to the unofficial position of supreme leader of the Workers' Party of Korea. Key posts as general secretary, chairman of the Central Military Commission, and Chairman of the National Defence Commission, as well as two seats in the five-member Politburo Presidium, remained vacant.

After celebrations for Kim Jong Il's 70th anniversary (during which he was elevated to the rank of Taewonsu, usually translated as grand marshal or Generalissimo), on 18 February the Politburo announced the convening of the 4th Party Conference for mid-April 2012 (near the 100th birth anniversary of Kim Il Sung) "to glorify the sacred revolutionary life and feats of Kim Jong-il for all ages and accomplish the Juche cause, the Songun revolutionary cause, rallied close around Kim Jong-un." Participants in the provincial party conferences endorsed the election of Kim Jong Un as a delegate to the 4th Party Conference. According to KCNA, provincial party conferences were held in Jagang, South Hwanghae, North Pyongan, and Kangwon and a city party conference was held in Rason (Rajin-Sonbong is one of three province-level cities). On 26 March 2012, Kim was elected a delegate to the 4th Party Conference by the party organization of the Korean People’s Army.

At the 4th Party Conference on 11 April, Kim Jong Il was declared to be the Eternal General Secretary and Kim Jong Un was elected to the newly created post of First Secretary of the Workers' Party of Korea, as well as Politburo Presidium member. The Conference also proclaimed Kimilsungism-Kimjongilism "as the only guiding idea of the party".

At the 8th Congress of the Workers' Party of Korea, held in early January 2021, Kim Jong Un delivered a nine-hour-long report in which he admitted failures in carrying out the economic plan and lambasted leading official's shortcomings. He also praised the country's nuclear capability and addressed the United States as the DPRK's main enemy. The congress restored the operative functions of the General Secretary of the Workers' Party of Korea, a title previously awarded "eternally" to Kim Jong Il, and elected Kim Jong Un to it.
