= Down-with-Imperialism Union =

- Abbreviation: DIU
- Founder: Ri Jong-rak
- Founded: 17 October 1926; 99 years ago
- Ideology: Marxism–Leninism
- Political position: Far-left

Party flag

Korean name
- Hangul: 타도제국주의동맹 (ㅌ.ㄷ)
- Hanja: 打倒帝國主義同盟 (ㅌ.ㄷ)
- RR: Tado jegukjuui dongmaeng (t.d)
- MR: T'ado chegukchuŭi tongmaeng (t'.t)

The Down-with-Imperialism Union (DIU; Korean: 타도제국주의동맹) was allegedly founded on 17 October 1926 in Hwatian County, Kirin, China, in order to fight against Japanese imperialism and to promote Marxism–Leninism. It is considered by the Workers' Party of Korea to be its root and foundation and its creation is celebrated every year.

== History ==
North Korean or sympathetic sources claim that the organization was founded and led by Kim Il Sung, who would have been fourteen years old at the time.

However, most scholarly sources identify Ri Jong-rak, a radical militant, as the founder of the Down with Imperialism Union also known as Down with Imperialism Alliance.

In 2016, in particular, the DIU received special attention, especially on 18–19 October. This included dramas, singing of songs in a Pyongyang plaza, "dancing parties" of students and youth, and wreaths laid at the graves of revolutionary martyrs to commemorate the founding of the revolutionary organisation, saying that it was the origin of the ideas of Juche. Additionally, commemorative stamps were released, a national meeting was held at the People's Palace of Culture attended by "senior party, state and army officials ... labour innovators and bereaved families of the revolutionary martyrs," a national art exhibition opened at the Korean Art Gallery, and members (and workers within) the General Federation of Trade Unions of Korea commemorated the occasion. A poster was even issued by Workers' Party of Korea to "mark the 90th anniversary of the formation of the Down-with-Imperialism Union (DIU)."

According to the North Korean newspaper Rodong Sinmun, in 2016, many people such as the chairperson of People Unity-"Kyrgyz El" Republican Political Party in Kyrgyzstan, the secretary general of Bangladesh Jatiya Party, the chairperson of the Juche Idea Study Society in India, the chairperson for the Juche Philosophy Study Committee in India, high-ranking individuals in the Pakistan-Korea Friendship Association, the National Committee for the Study of the Juche Idea of the Democratic Republic of the Congo all praised the developments of the Workers' Party of Korea and celebrated the DIU's anniversary.

=== Claimed Juche connection ===
On 17 October 1982, Kim Jong Il honoured the DIU with a speech. In the speech he said that its formation meant that the Korean people had "embarked on a new road of development and our Party [Workers' Party of Korea] began to strike its glorious roots." He went on to explain the accomplishments of his party in defending the country from the American imperialism and claimed that it had promoted the idea of Juche, which, in reality, was first expressed in 1955 at the earliest in Kim Il Sung's speech entitled On Eliminating Dogmatism and Formalism and Establishing Juche in Ideological Work. He also said that Kim Il Sung began the DIU with a programme to engage in "anti-Japanese national-liberation struggle relying on the masses", that its formation was the "fresh start for the Korean communist movement and the Korean revolution ... the beginning of the struggle to found a new type of party," and added that "The Korean communist movement ... pioneered the revolutionary road under the banner of the DIU."

== Doubts on its existence ==
The story of Down-with-Imperialism Union first appears in North Korean literature in Minjogŭi t'aeyang Kim Il-sŏng changgun [Sun of the People, General Kim Il Sung] by North Korean author Baik Bong. 10 years later in 1978, in the Complete History of Korea (조선전사), the story has been lengthened with its meaning evaluated to the point of "the turning point of modern history of the Korean nation", however, no mention of such incident of such significance is found in any literature before 1968.

It is suspected that the real owner for such anti-Japanese activities was the Gilheuk Peasant Union (길흑농민동맹) in Manchuria led by Ri Jong-rak which participated in anti-imperialist activities and thus, was named the "Down with Imperialism Union" (ㅌ.ㄷ).

== Commemorative coins ==
In 1996 and 2016 the Central Bank of DPRK issued commemorative coins commemorating the 70th and 90th anniversaries of the Formation of the DIU.
