= Ahobiryong Mountains =

Mountain range in North Korea

- Hangul: 아호비령산맥
- Hanja: 阿虎飛嶺山脈
- RR: Ahobiryeongsanmaek
- MR: Ahobiryŏngsanmaek

Ahobiryong Mountains

Naming
- Etymology: Tiger Leaping Peak

Geography
- Country: North Korea
- Provinces: North Hwanghae and Kangwon

The Ahobiryong Mountains is a mountain range stretching from north to south in central North Korea. The range, starting from Mount Turyu in Chagang Province, straddles the border between North Hwanghae and Kangwon provinces and ends in Mount Songak in Kaesong. The most famous part of the range is located near Kaesong, the ancient capital of the Koryo dynasty.

== Etymology ==
The name "Ahobiryong" means "Tiger Leaping Peak" in Korean.

== Historical and tourism significance ==
This region is a tourist attraction, and the valley between Mts. Chonma (天摩山) and Songgo (聖居山) is home to the Pakyon Falls, which is considered as one of the three famous falls of Korea, as well as the Koryo-era Taehungsan Fortress, which in turn encompasses two ancient Buddhist temples (Kwanumsa and Taehungsa). The Ryongtongsa Buddhist temple, which was the origin place of the Chontae sect, is also located in the mountains at the foot of Mt. Ogwan (五關山). It was once a place of pilgrimage, as it contained the ashes of Uichon, founder of the Chontae sect, but burned down in the 17th century. It was reconstructed between 2001 and 2005 as an inter-Korean project.
