= Kwanumsa (Kaesong) =

Buddhist temple in North Korea

Coordinates: 38°5′7″N 126°34′21″E

- Hangul: 관음사
- Hanja: 觀音寺
- RR: Gwaneumsa
- MR: Kwanŭmsa

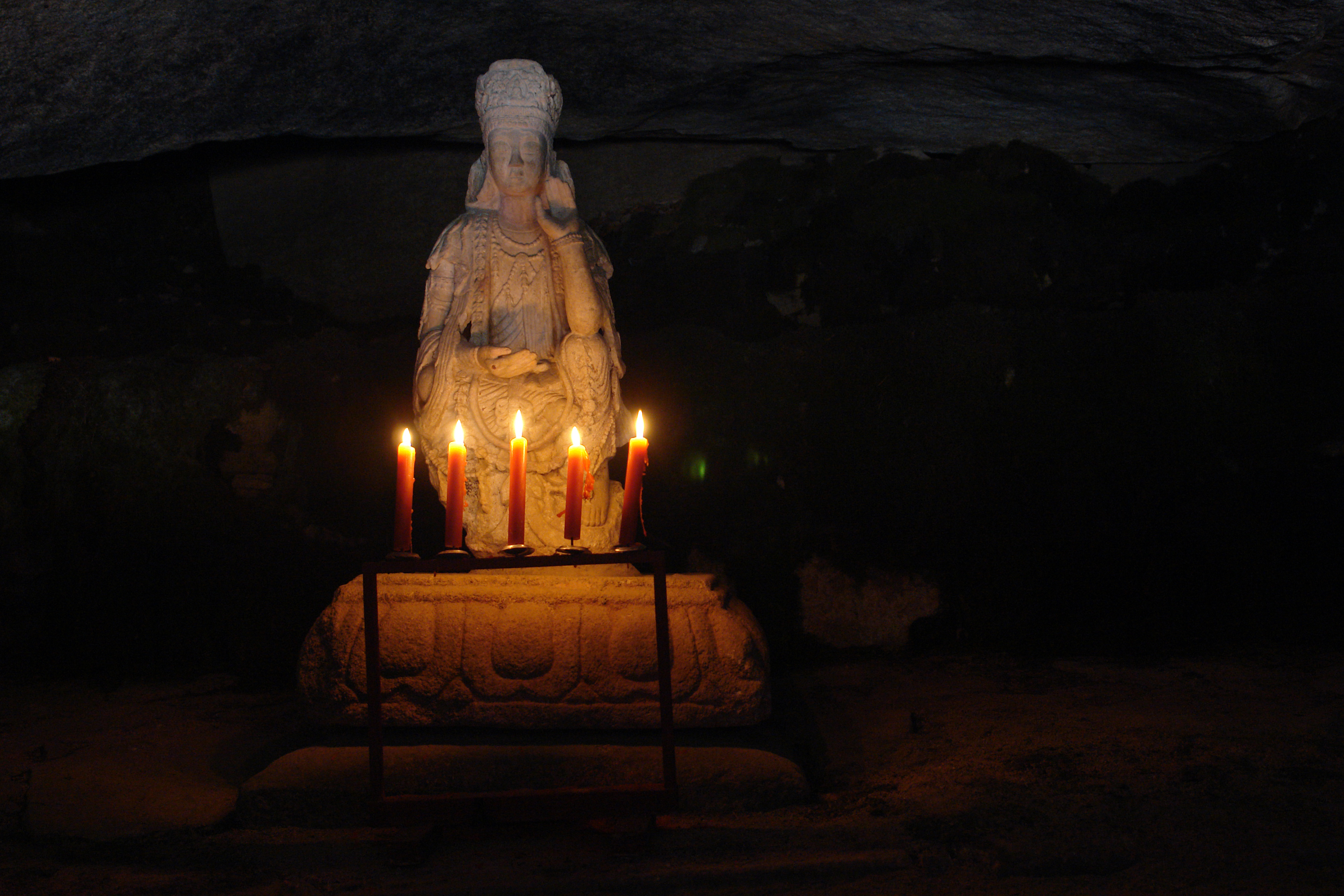
Rare marble Buddhist Avalokitesvara statue, from the Koryo (Goryeo) Dynasty - in situ in a cave near Kwaneumsa (Kwaneum [Guanyin] Temple), Kaesong, North Korea.

Kwanŭmsa is a Korean Buddhist temple located within Taehung Castle on Mt. Chonma near Kaesong, North Korea. The site is one of the National Treasures of North Korea. Named after Guanyin, the buddhist bodhisattva of compassion, this small temple is located in the valley between Mts. Chonma and Songgo. The temple was founded in 970 when a monk deposited two marble statues of the goddess in a cave behind the temple's current location. The temple itself was constructed in 1393 under the Koryo Dynasty, and later renovated in 1646 under the Joseon. The site contains many ancient relics, including a seven-story pagoda from the Koryo dynasty and the ancient Guanyin statues in Kwanum Cave. The doors of the main shrine, known as the Taeung Hall, are decorated with carved flowers and leaves; an old legend relays why the decorations on one door are unfinished. During the reconstruction of the temple during the Joseon dynasty, one of the main carvers was a twelve-year-old boy named Unna, famed for his skill in carving. One day, while working on the temple, he heard his mother was seriously ill, and asked to be allowed to visit her. He was refused, and his mother died shortly after. He blamed himself and his skillful hands for his mother's death, and so out of grief used his carving axe to chop off his hand. He then disappeared into the forest, never to be seen again. Today, a carving of a boy with one hand ascending to heaven on the back of a white tiger can still be seen on the unfinished door.

== See also ==
- Taehung Castle
- Taehungsa
- Korean Buddhism
- National Treasures of North Korea
