= Songbulsa =

Temple in North Korea

Coordinates: 38°34′51″N 125°45′04″E

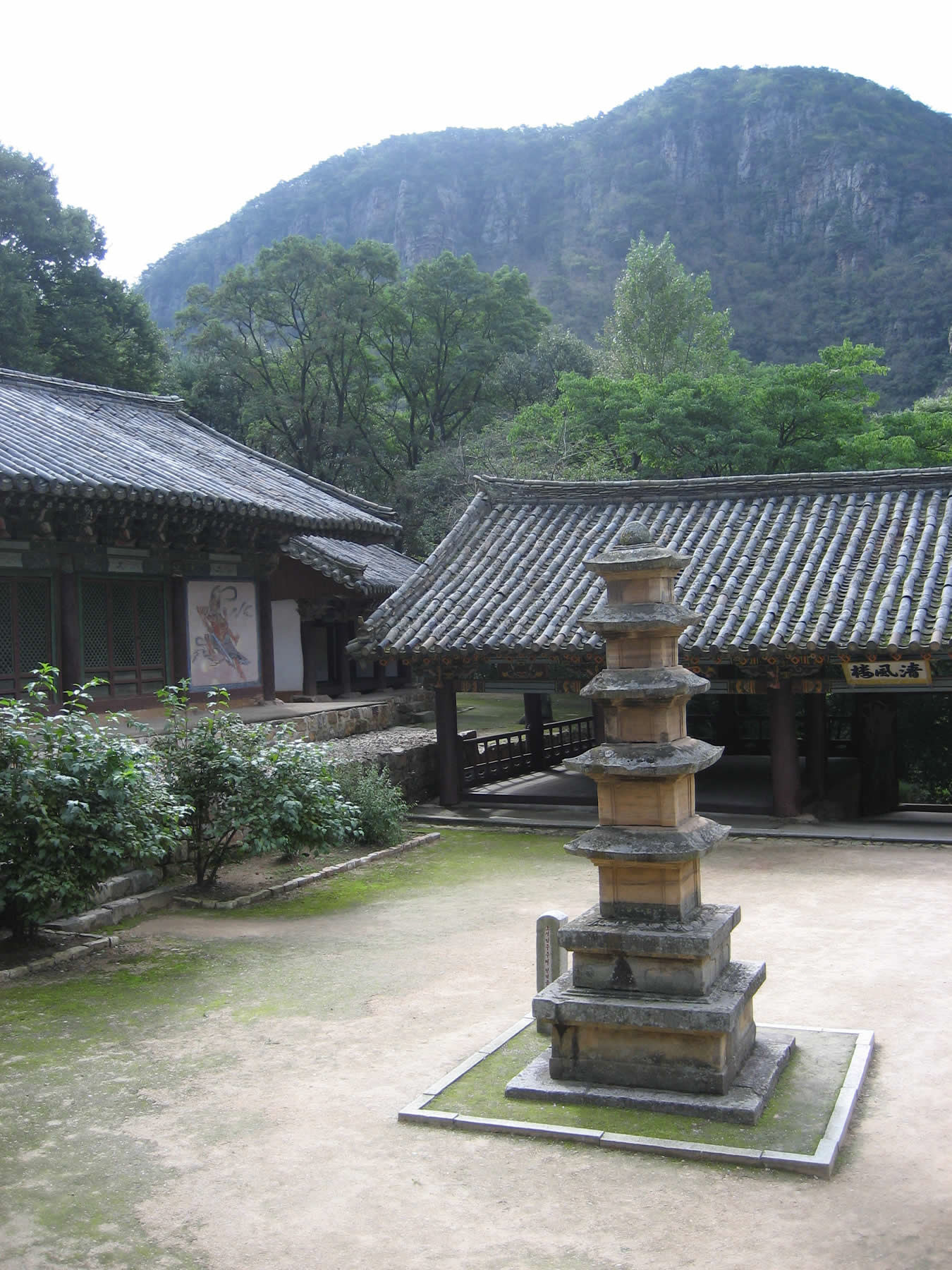

Korean name
- Hangul: 성불사
- Hanja: 成佛寺
- RR: Seongbulsa
- MR: Sŏngbulsa

Sŏngbul-sa (Korean: 성불사; Hanja: 成佛寺) is a Korean Buddhist temple in Sariwŏn, North Hwanghae Province, North Korea. It is located within the castle on Mt. Jŏngbang and was founded in 898 AD. The temple consists of six buildings, some of which are among the oldest wooden buildings in North Korea.

- Kukrak Hall (극락전/極樂殿). Rebuilt in 1374, this pavilion sits on a raised stone platform and features delicate paintings, cow-tongue eaves, and doors with carved flower grilles. A Koryo period five-story stone pagoda stands in front of it.
- Ungjin Hall (웅진전/雄津殿). Rebuilt in 1327, Ungjin Shrine is one of the oldest wooden buildings in North Korea. The long, spacious hall sits on a raised platform, and is a paradigm of Koryo architecture.
- Myŏngbu Hall (명부전/冥府殿)
- Chongpung Pavilion (청풍루/清風樓)
- Unha Hall (운하당/雲霞堂)
- Sansin Shrine (산신각/山神閣)

== See also ==
- Chongbang Fortress
- Korean architecture
- Korean Buddhism
