= Taehungsan Fortress =

- Hangul: 대흥산성
- Hanja: 大興山城
- RR: Daeheungsanseong
- MR: Taehŭngsansŏng

Taehung Castle is a mountain fortress of the early Goryeo period, located outside Kaesŏng, North Korea. Originally encompassing both Mts. Chŏnma and Songgo, the castle was first founded as a fortress for the defense of the capital, encircled by over 10 kilometers of stone walls. Today, many of the walls have become overgrown ruins.

The fortress contains two small Buddhist temples, Kwanumsa and Taehungsa.

== North Gate ==
The only one of the fortress' original six gates to survive to the present day, this gate is located just behind Pakyon Falls and is topped with a Joseon-dynasty pavilion.

== Kwanŭm Temple ==
Named after Guanyin, the buddhist bodhisattva of compassion, this small temple is located in the beautiful valley between Mts. Songgo and Chŏnma. The temple was founded in 970 when a monk deposited two marble statues of the goddess in a cave behind the temple's current location. The temple itself was constructed in 1393 under the Koryo dynasty, and later renovated in 1646 under the Joseon. The site contains many ancient relics, including a seven-story pagoda from the Koryo dynasty and the ancient Guanyin statues in Kwanum Cave.

== Taehŭng Temple ==
Higher up on the mountain sits Taehŭng Temple, now much diminished from its Koryo-dynasty splendor. The building that exists today is only the temple school, famed as the place where the son of King Taejo, founder of Koryo, studied around 921. After the much larger main temple was destroyed during the Red Turbans invasions of Korea, the temple school was converted for use as the main temple.

== See also ==
- Jongbang Castle
- National Treasures of North Korea
