= Chongbang Fortress =

Koguryo-era mountain fortress in North Korea

Coordinates: 38.57524°N 125.7461151°E

- Hangul: 정방산성
- Hanja: 正方山城
- RR: Jeongbangsanseong
- MR: Chŏngbangsansŏng

Jŏngbang Castle (Korean: 정방산성) is a Koguryo-era mountain fortress located outside Sariwŏn, North Hwanghae Province, North Korea. Cresting the ridges of Mt. Jŏngbang, the fortress was built for the defence of the Koguryo capital of Pyongyang. Rebuilt in 1632 by Kim Chajŏm, the fortress skillfully uses the surrounding cliffs by cutting down the outer slope and winding around the cliffs and ridges, to give a fortress surrounded by over 12 kilometres of 6-metre high stone walls, which extend to over ten metres tall in some places. The walls are pierced by four large gates, the most well preserved of which is the south one. Inside the walled fortress, there are the ruins of commander's posts, barracks, arsenals, armories, granaries and storehouses.

The Sŏngbul Temple, founded in 898 and containing some of the oldest wooden buildings in North Korea, is located within the fortress' walls.

== See also ==
- Taehŭng Castle
- National Treasures of North Korea
