= Duryunsan =

Mountain in South Korea

Coordinates: 34°28′22″N 126°38′16″E

Highest point
- Elevation: 700 m (2,300 ft)

Geography
- Location: South Jeolla Province, South Korea

Duryunsan (Korean: 두륜산) is a mountain of South Jeolla Province, western South Korea. It has an elevation of 700 metres.

== See also ==
- List of mountains of Korea
