= Daeheungsa =

Buddhist temple in Haenam, South Korea

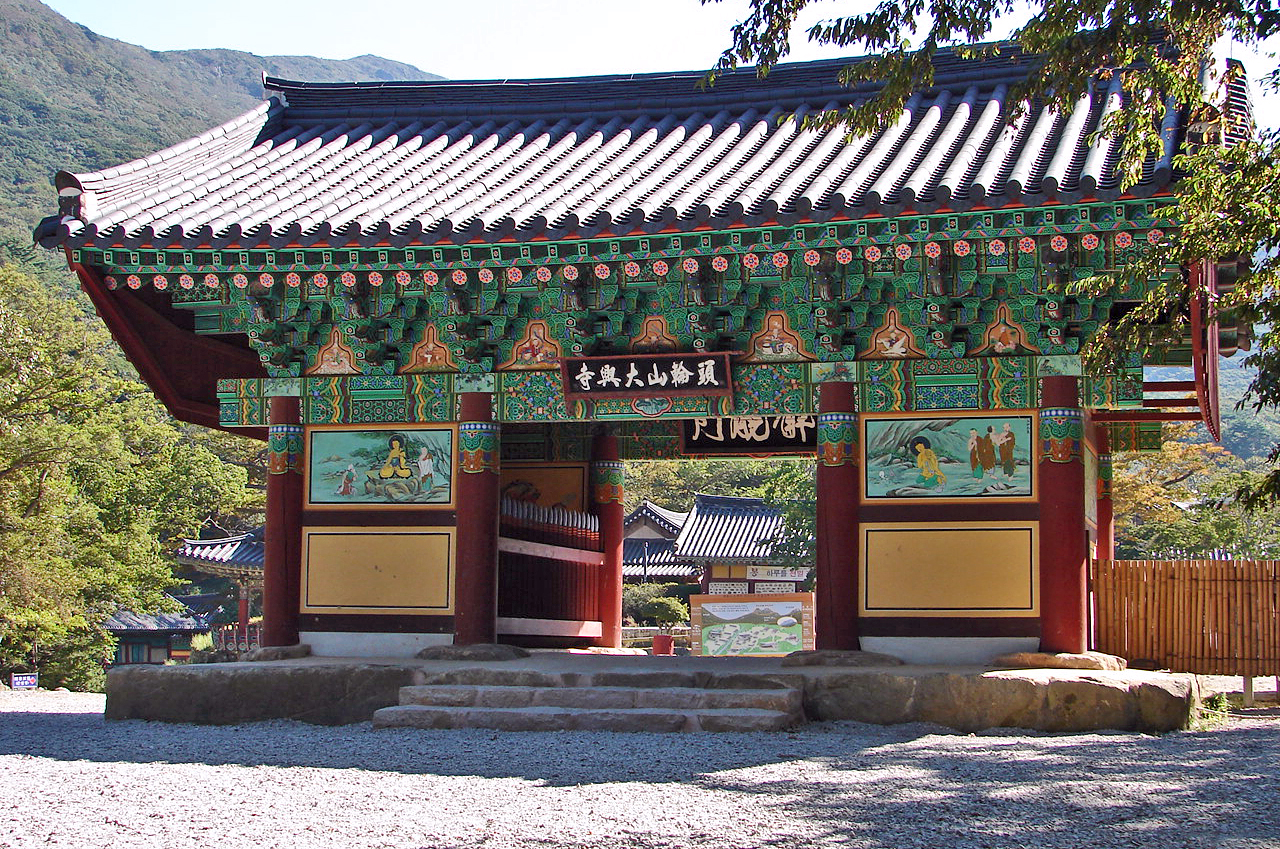

Location
- Location: Haenam County, South Korea
- Interactive map of Daeheungsa
- Coordinates: 34°28′35.3″N 126°37′00.7″E

Architecture
- UNESCO World Heritage Site
- Criteria: Cultural: iii
- Designated: 2018
- Parent listing: Sansa, Buddhist Mountain Monasteries in Korea
- Reference no.: 1562-7
- Historic Sites of South Korea
- Official name: Daeheungsa Temple, Haenam
- Designated: 2009-12-21

Korean name
- Hangul: 대흥사
- Hanja: 大興寺
- RR: Daeheungsa
- MR: Taehŭngsa

Daeheungsa (Korean: 대흥사), sometimes called Daedunsa, is a main temple of the Jogye Order of Korean Buddhism. Daeheungsa is located on the slopes of Duryunsan (Duryun Mountain) in Samsan township, Haenam County, South Jeolla Province, South Korea.

== Origins ==
Daeheungsa is believed to date to the Three Kingdoms period (4th-9th centuries CE). Although no exact record of its founding has survived, some think Daeheungsa was founded by Adohwasang (Monk) in 514.

Originally, this temple was called Handeumjeol, after the mountain's original name, Mount Handeum. Chinese characters were eventually used, which caused it to be called Daedum, and later, the name was changed to Daeheungsa. The mountain's name was later changed to Mount Duryun.

Daeheungsa received little attention until 1592, when Seosan Daesa (monk) organized and trained a guerilla army of 5,000 monks at the temple to help defend the Korean people during the Imjin War (Japanese invasions).

== Treasures ==
=== Cultural Properties #348 ===
Daeheungsabungmireugammaaeyeoraejwasang (North rock-cut seated Maitreya Buddha of Daeheung Temple) is a cliffside Buddha carved out of a large natural wall of rock, believed to date from the early years of the Goryeo Dynasty (918-1392). This estimate is based on the sculptural style and the way the lower part of the body is out of proportion with the larger upper part.

The mudra, or symbolic hand gesture, signifies expelling devils. The robe is tied on the left shoulder, which is rather uncommon. One distinctive feature of this statue is the beobeui (sacerdotal robe), which was typical of this era. The hands look weak, and the form of the legs is very awkward.

=== Treasure #320 ===
Three-Storied Stone Pagoda of Daeheungsa is a 4.3 meter/14.1-foot-high stone pagoda typical of the Silla Dynasty, and which stands in front of Eungjinjeon (hall). This pagoda is very neat and elegant in its construction.

=== Treasure #1347 ===
Stupa of Seosan Dasae of Daeheungasa is the reliquary for preserving the sarira (pearl or crystal-like, bead-shaped objects that are purportedly found among the cremated ashes of Buddhist spiritual masters) of the monk Seosan Dasae. He is renowned as the monk who led an army that defeated invading Japanese forces. This 2.6 meter/8.5-foot-high stupa is believed to have been erected in 1648.

== Features ==
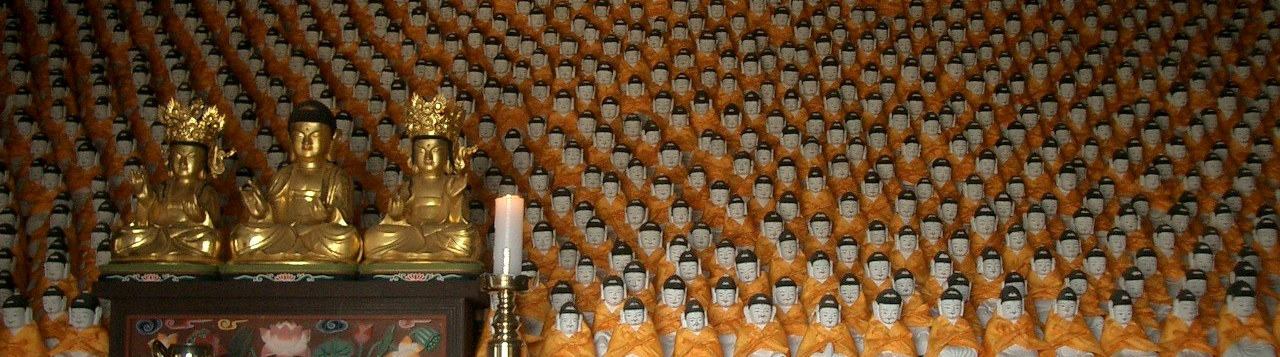
Cheonbuljeon's 1,000 smiling Buddhas

Daeheungsa is very famous for the long walkway to the entrance, which wanders through a beautiful forest at the foot of Duryun Mountain.

Inside Cheonbuljeon (Thousand Buddha Hall) are 1,000 smiling Buddha statues. The tiny Buddhas represent the Buddha that is omnipresent in the past, present, and future, and that anyone can become a buddha. Records indicate that Cheonbuljeon burned down in 1811 and was rebuilt in 1813.

The temple is famous as a historical center of Korean tea culture.

== Gallery ==
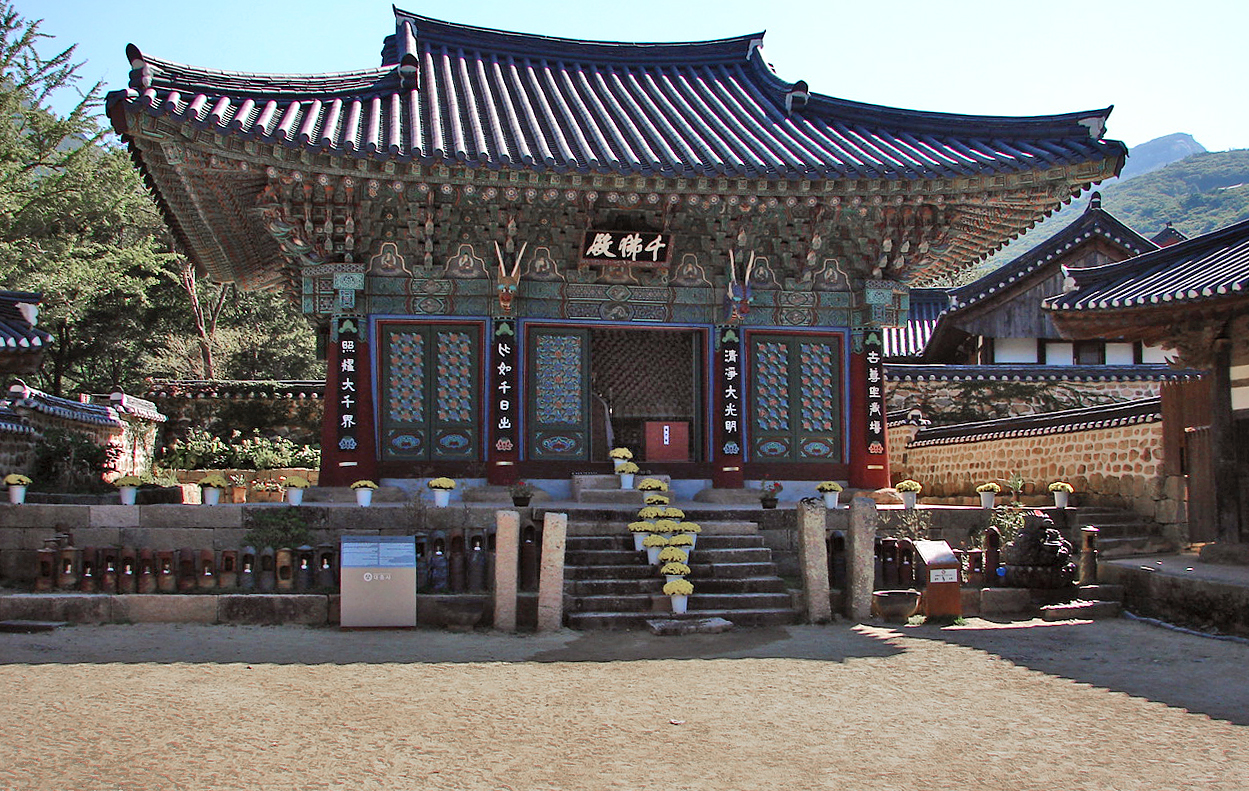

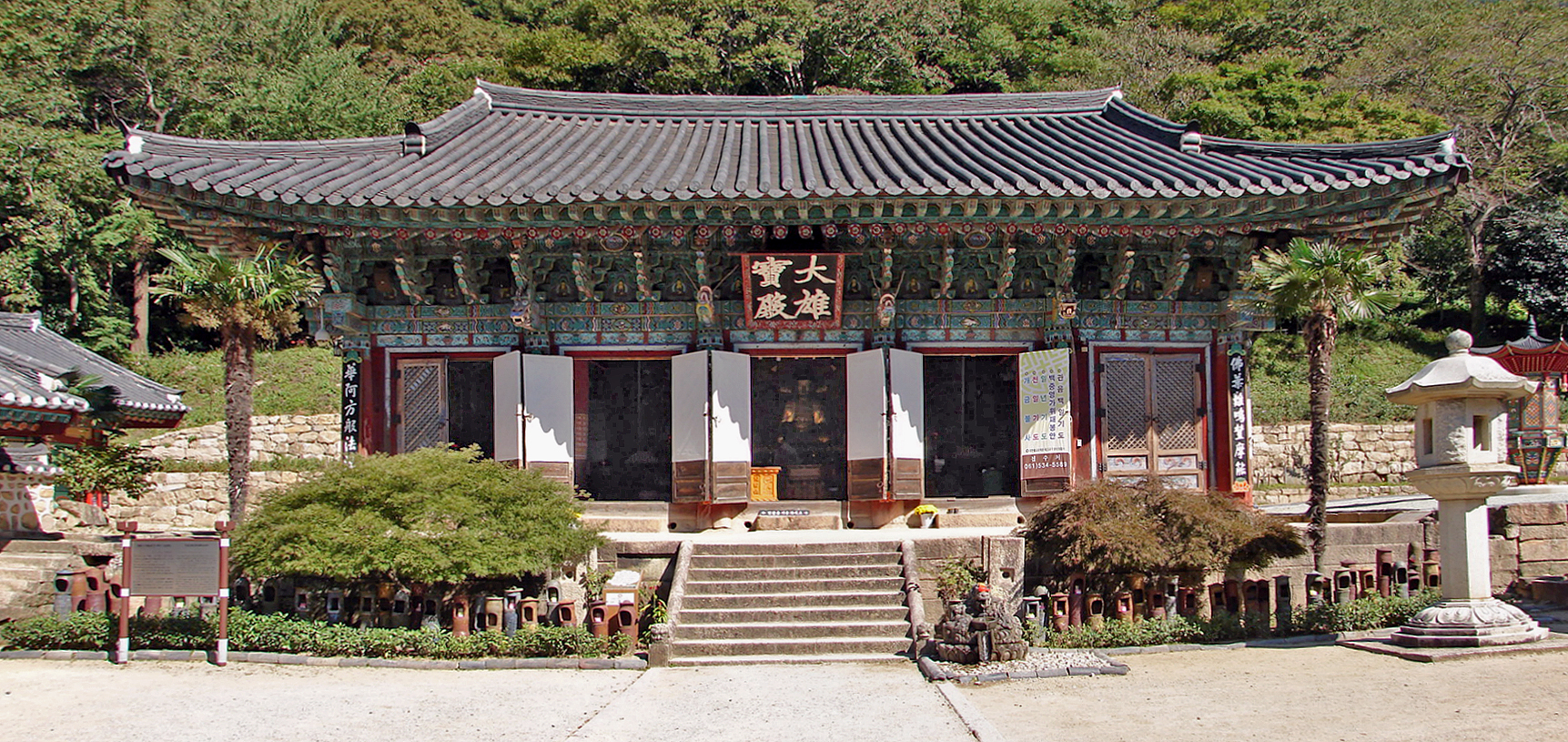

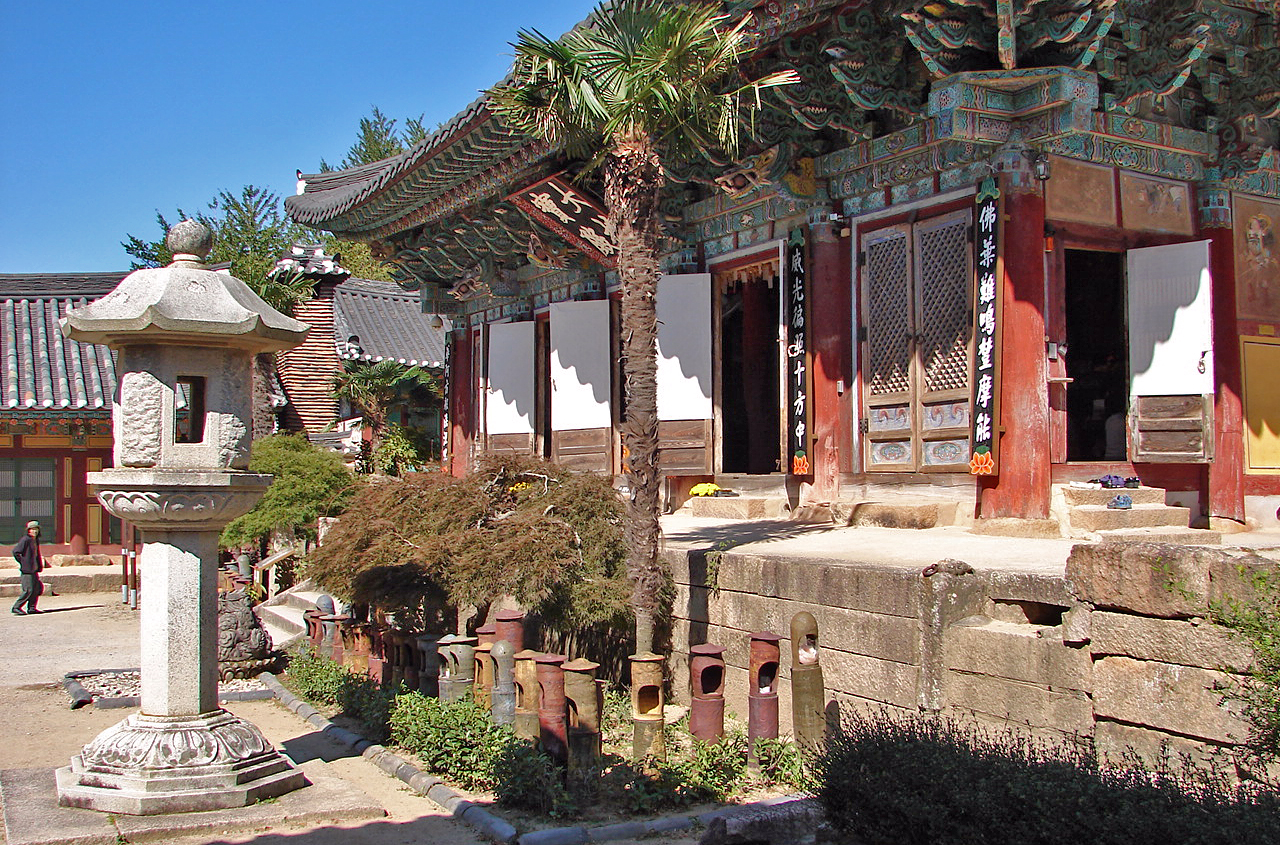

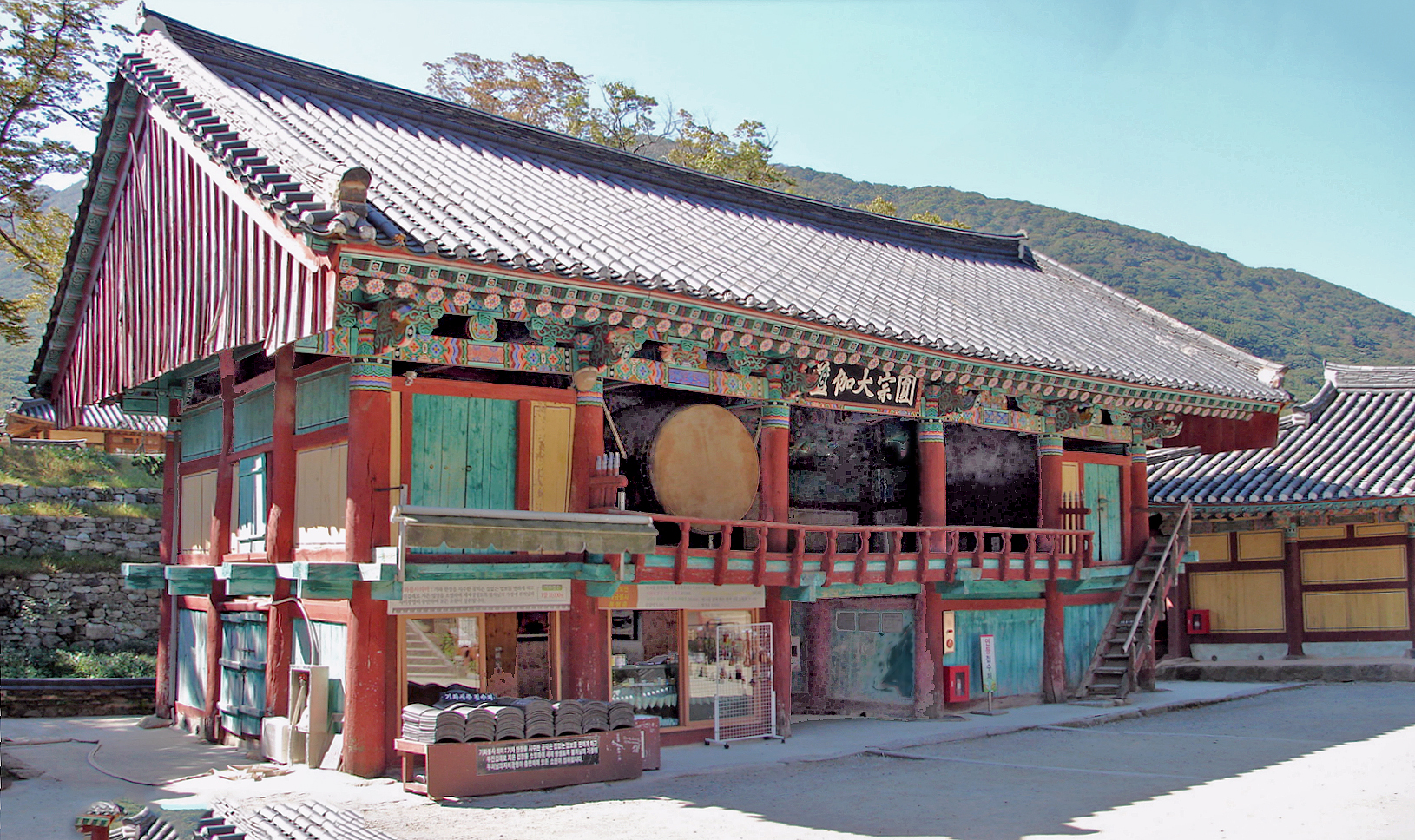

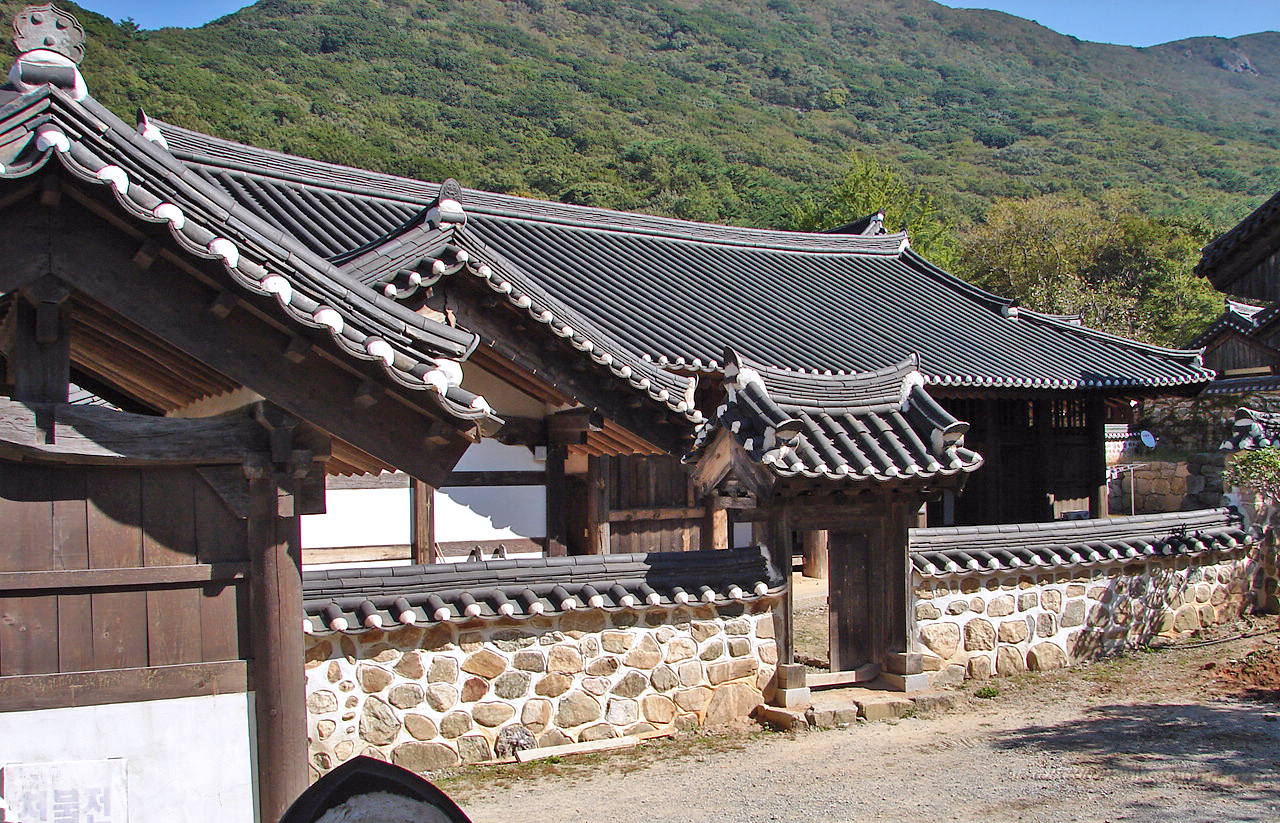

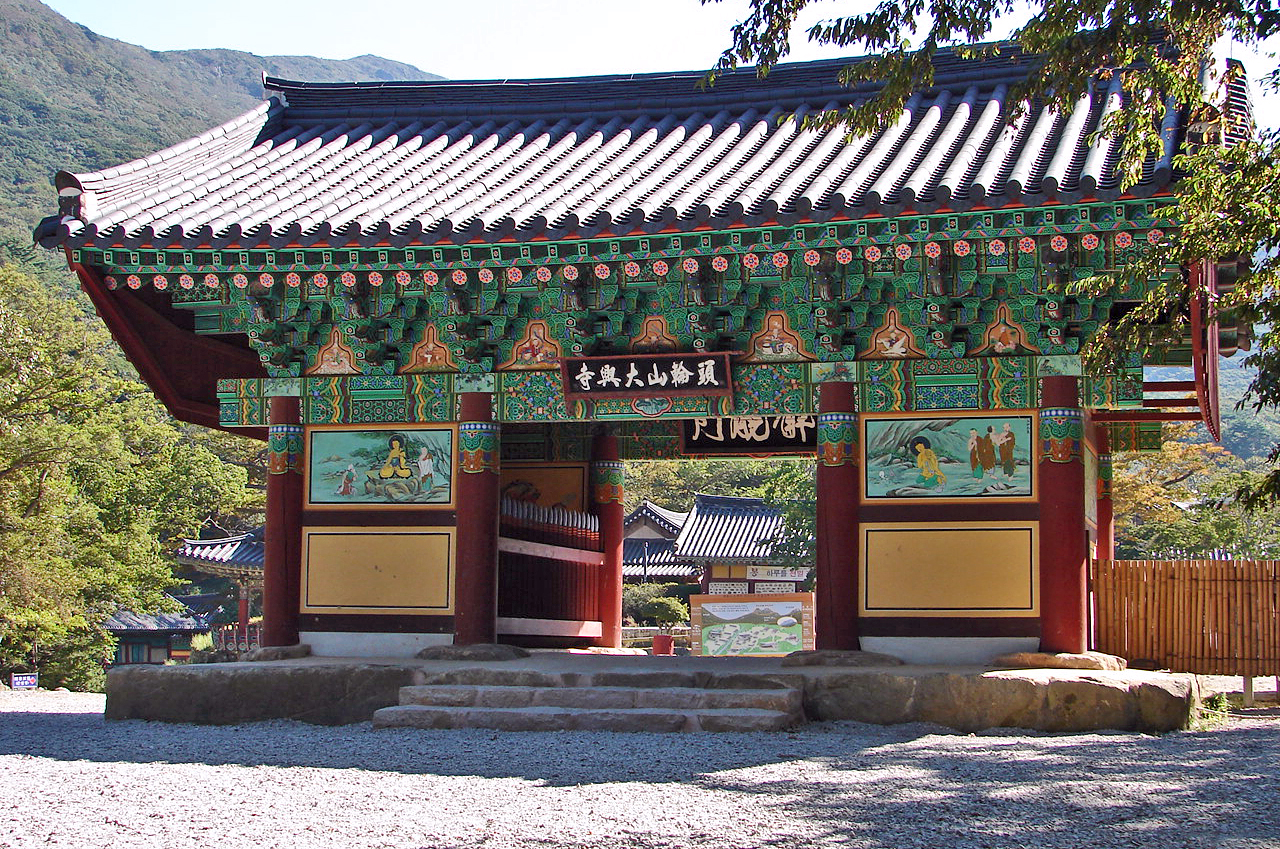

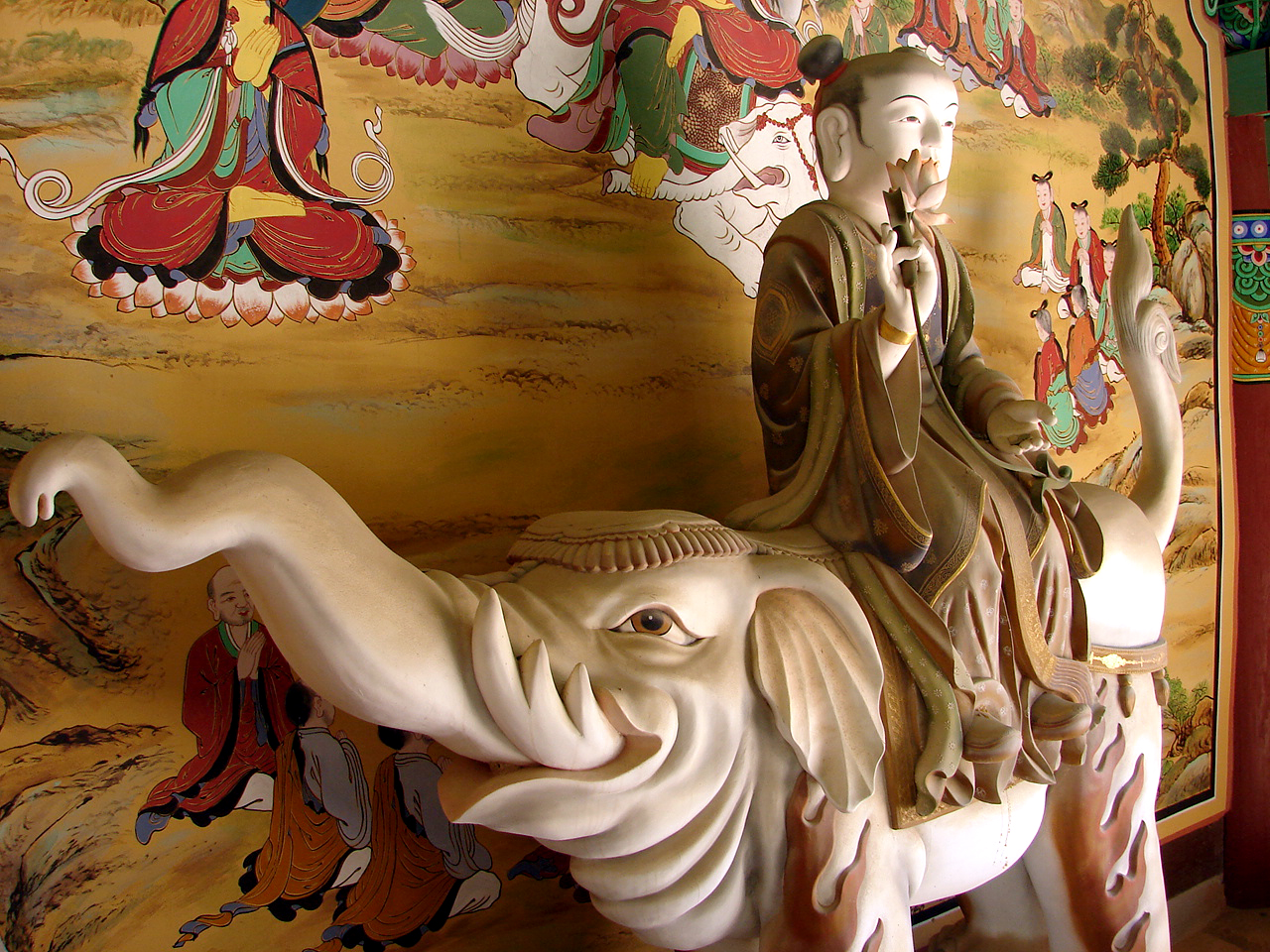

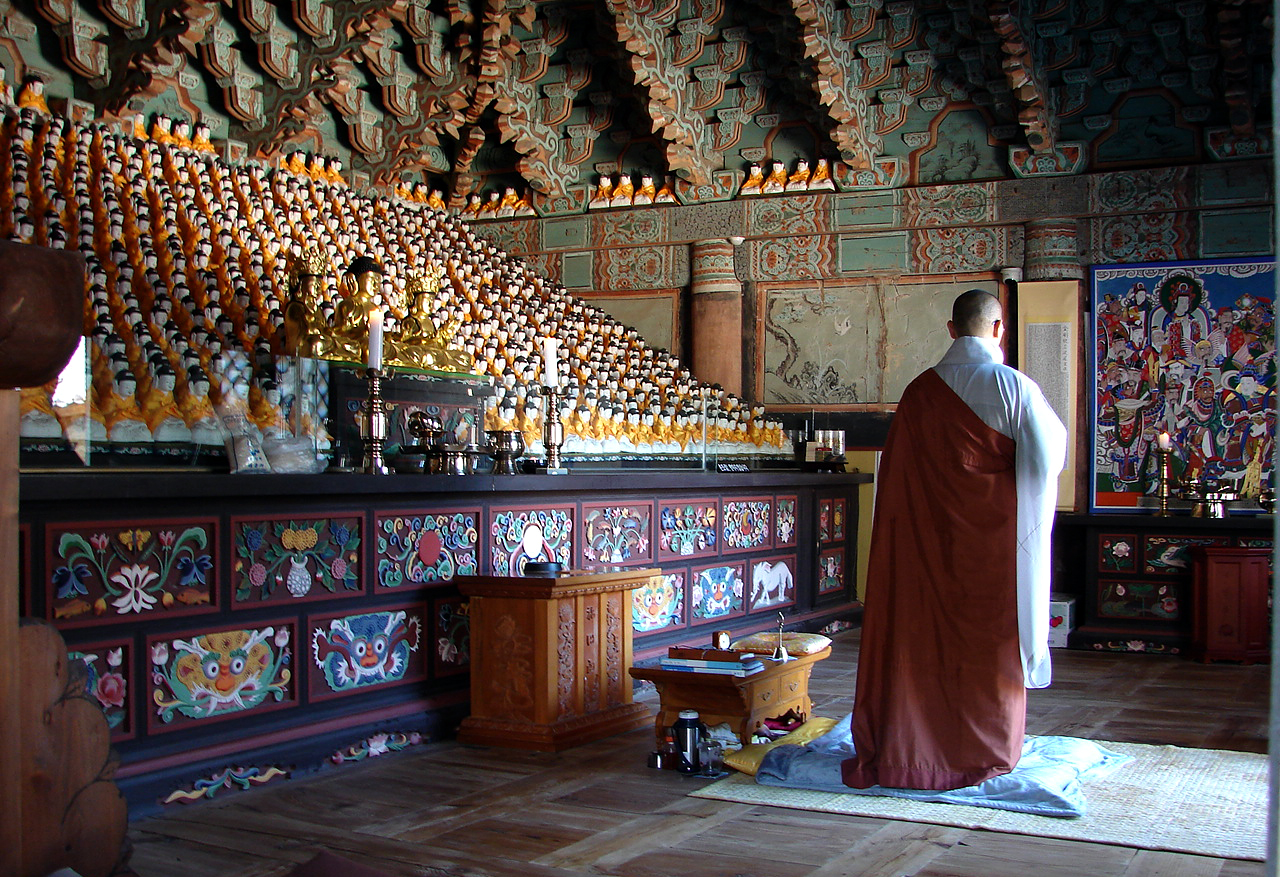

External videos
- Daeheungsa

== See also ==
- Korean Buddhist temples
- Religion in South Korea
