= List of Buddhist temples in Korea =

This is a list of Buddhist temples in North Korea and South Korea. As of 2004, there are 64 temples in North Korea. There are about 20,000 Buddhist temples in South Korea.

== List ==
The following list is sorted by Romanized names, but it also can be sorted by Korean names, by provinces (SK=South Korea, NK=North Korea), or by counties (i.e. gun or si). "×" indicates temples that no longer exist and "?" indicates disputed or unknown information. A star in the first column denotes the 31 head temples designated during the Japanese colonial period.

*	Temple	Hangeul	Hanja	Province	County	Founded	Ref.
	Anguksa	안국사	安國寺	NK South Pyongan	Pyongsong-si	503	
	Anhwasa×	안화사	安和寺	NK North Hwanghae	Kaesong-si	930	
*	Baegyangsa	백양사	白羊寺	SK South Jeolla	Jangseong-gun	632	
	Baekdamsa	백담사	百潭寺	SK Gangwon	Inje-gun	650 circa	
	Baengnyulsa	백률사	栢栗寺	SK North Gyeongsang	Gyeongju-si	692	
	Baengnyeonsa	백련사	白蓮寺	SK South Jeolla	Gangjin-gun	650 circa	
*	Beomeosa	범어사	梵魚寺	SK Busan	Geumjeong District	678	
	Beophwasa×	법화사	法華寺	SK Jeju	Seogwipo-si	5~7C?	
*	Beopjusa	법주사	法住寺	SK North Chungcheong	Boeun-gun	553	
	Bogyeongsa	보경사	寶鏡寺	SK North Gyeongsang	Pohang-si	602	
	Bomunsa	보문사	普門寺	SK Incheon	Ganghwa-gun	635	
*	Bongeunsa	봉은사	奉恩寺	SK Seoul	Gangnam-gu	794	
	Bongjeongsa	봉정사	鳳停寺	SK North Gyeongsang	Andong-si	672	
	Bongnyeongsa	봉녕사	奉寧寺	SK Gyeonggi	Suwon-si	1208	
*	Bongseonsa	봉선사	奉先寺	SK Gyeonggi	Namyangju-si	969	
	Bongwonsa	봉원사	奉元寺	SK Seoul	Seodaemun-gu	889	
*	Boseoksa	보석사	寶石寺	SK South Chungcheong	Geumsan-gun	885	
	Bulguksa and Seokguram	불국사	佛國寺	SK North Gyeongsang	Gyeongju-si	528 and 751	
	Buseoksa	부석사	浮石寺	SK North Gyeongsang	Yeongju-si	676	
	Chahyesa	자혜사	慈惠寺	NK South Hwanghae	Sinchon County	early Goryeo	
	Cheongpyeongsa	청평사	淸平寺	SK Gangwon	Chuncheon-si	973	
	Chongrungsa×	정릉사	定陵寺	NK Pyongyang	Ryokpo-guyok	426	
	Chonjusa	천주사	天柱寺	NK North Pyongan	Yongbyon-gun	1684	
*	Daeheungsa	대흥사	大興寺	SK South Jeolla	Haenam-gun	514?	
*	Donghwasa	동화사	桐華寺	SK Daegu	Dong-gu	493 and 832	
	Doseonsa	도선사	道詵寺	SK Seoul	Gangbuk-gu	862	
*	Eunhaesa	은해사	銀海寺	SK North Gyeongsang	Yeongcheon	809	
*	Geonbongsa	건봉사	乾鳳寺	SK Gangwon	Goseong-gun	520	
	Geumdangsa	금당사	金塘寺	SK North Jeolla	Jinan-gun	814	
	Geumsansa	금산사	金山寺	SK North Jeolla	Gimje-si	600 and 770	
	Geumtapsa	금탑사	金塔寺	SK South Jeolla	Goheung-gun	650 circa	
*	Gimnyongsa	김룡사	金龍寺	SK North Gyeongsang	Mungyeong	588	
*	Girimsa	기림사	祇林寺	SK North Gyeongsang	Gyeongju-si	643	
*	Gounsa	고운사	孤雲寺	SK North Gyeongsang	Uiseong-gun	681	
	Guinsa	구인사	救仁寺	SK North Chungcheong	Danyang-gun	1945	
	Guryongsa	구룡사	龜龍寺	SK Gangwon	Wonju	668	
	Gwaneumsa (Seoul)	관음사	觀音寺	SK Seoul	Gwanak-gu	895	
	Gwaneumsa (Jeju City)	관음사	觀音寺	SK Jeju	Jeju City	?	
	Gyeongguksa	경국사	慶國寺	SK Seoul	Seongbuk-gu	1325	
*	Haeinsa	해인사	海印寺	SK South Gyeongsang	Hapcheon-gun	802	
	Hangnimsa×	학림사	鶴林寺	NK South Hwanghae	Changyon-gun	Silla	
	Hungwangsa×	흥왕사	興王寺	NK North Hwanghae	Kaepung-gun	1067	
*	Hwaeomsa	화엄사	華嚴寺	SK South Jeolla	Gurye-gun	544	
	Hwangnyongsa×	황룡사	皇龍寺	SK North Gyeongsang	Gyeongju-si	553	
	Hwasong Ssanggyesa	화성쌍계사	化成雙磎寺	NK North Hamgyong	Myonggan-gun	1395	
	Hyonam	현암	縣庵	NK South Hwanghae	Chaeryong-gun	?	
	Jajaeam	자재암	自在庵	SK Gyeonggi	Dongducheon	654	
	Jangansa×	장안사	長安寺	NK Kangwon	Kumgang-gun	551	
*	Jeondeungsa	전등사	傳燈寺	SK Incheon	Ganghwa-gun	381	
	Jeongyangsa	정양사	正陽寺	NK Kangwon	Kumgang-gun	600	
	Jeungsimsa	증심사	証心寺	SK Gwangju	Dong District	860	
	Jikjisa	직지사	直指寺	SK North Gyeongsang	Gimcheon-si	418	
	Jingwansa	진관사	津寬寺	SK Seoul	Eunpyeong-gu	Goryeo	
	Jogyesa	조계사	曹溪寺	SK Seoul	Jongno-gu	1395 & 1910	
	Jonggwangsa	정광사	定光寺	NK South Hamgyong	Riwon-gun	838	
	Jongjinsa	정진사	淨進寺	NK South Pyongan	Songchon County	?	
	Junghungsa	중흥사	重興寺	NK Ryanggang	Samsu-gun	1570	
	Kaesimsa	개심사	開心寺	NK North Hamgyong	Myongchon-gun	826 and 1377	
	Kaewonsa	개원사	開元寺	NK North Pyongan	Chongju	?	
	Kangsosa	강서사	江西寺	NK South Hwanghae	Paechon-gun	?	
	Kumgwangsa	금광사	金光寺	NK North Pyongan	Uiju-gun	?	
	Kwangbopsa	광법사	廣法寺	NK Pyongyang	Taesong-guyok	Goryeo	
	Kwangjesa	광제사	光濟寺	NK South Hamgyong	Pukchong-gun	1467	
	Kwanumsa	관음사	觀音寺	NK North Hwanghae	Kaesong-si	970 and 1393	
	Kwijinsa	귀진사	歸眞寺	NK North Hwanghae	Sohung-gun	mid 12C	
*	Kwijusa×	귀주사	歸州寺	NK South Hamgyong	Hamhung-si	Goryeo	
*	Magoksa	마곡사	麻谷寺	SK South Chungcheong	Gongju-si	640	
	Mahayonsa×	마하연사	摩訶衍寺	NK Kangwon	Kumgang-gun	661	
	Mihwangsa	미황사	美黃寺	SK South Jeolla	Haenam-gun	749	
	Mireuksa	미륵사	彌勒寺	SK North Jeolla	Iksan-si	602	
	Myongjoksa	명적사	明寂寺	NK Kangwon	Wonsan-si	Silla	
	Naesosa	내소사		SK North Jeolla	Buan-gun	633	
	Nakgasa	낙가사	洛伽寺	SK Gangwon	Gangneung-si	Goryeo	
	Naksansa	낙산사	洛山寺	SK Gangwon	Yangyang-gun	671	
	Oseam	오세암	五歲庵	SK Gangwon	Inje	643	
*	Paeyopsa	패엽사	貝葉寺	NK South Hwanghae	Sinchon County	Silla	
	Pagyesa	파계사	把溪寺	SK Daegu	Dong-gu	804	
	Pobunam	법운암	法雲庵	NK Pyongyang	Mangyongdae-guyok	Goguryeo	
	Podok Hermitage	보덕암	普德庵	NK Kangwon	Kumgang-gun	mid 6C	
*	Pohyonsa	보현사	普賢寺	NK North Pyongan	Hyangsan-gun	1025 circa	
	Pohyonsa (Anbyon)	보현사	普賢寺	NK Kangwon	Anbyŏn-gun	737	
*	Pophungsa	법흥사	法興寺	NK South Pyongan	Pyongwon-gun	?	
	Powolsa	보월사	寶月寺	NK North Pyongan	Kujang-gun	975	
	Pulilsa×	불일사	佛日寺	NK Kaesong	Panmun-gun	951	
	Puljiam	불지암	佛池庵	NK Kangwon	Kumgang-gun	Silla	
	Pyohunsa	표훈사	表訓寺	NK Kangwon	Kumgang-gun	670	
	Ryangchonsa	량천사	梁泉寺	NK South Hamgyong	Kowon-gun	753?	
	Ryonghungsa	룡흥사	龍興寺	NK South Hamgyong	Yonggwang-gun	1048	
	Ryonghwasa	룡화사	龍華寺	NK Pyongyang	Moranbong-guyok	1920s	
	Ryongtongsa	령통사	靈通寺	NK North Hwanghae	Kaepung-gun	1027	
	Samhwasa	삼화사	三和寺	SK Gangwon	Donghae-si	Unified Silla	
	Sangwonam	상원암	上元庵	NK North Pyongan	Hyangsan-gun	Goryeo	
*	Seonamsa	선암사	仙巖寺	SK South Jeolla	Suncheon-si	875	
	Seonunsa	선운사	禪雲寺	SK North Jeolla	Gochang-gun	577	
	Silleuksa	신륵사	神勒寺	SK Gyeonggi	Yeoju-si	580	
	Silsangsa	실상사	實相寺	SK North Jeolla	Namwon-si	828	
	Simwonsa (Pakchon)	심원사	深源寺	NK North Pyongan	Pakchon County	9C	
	Simwonsa (Yontan)	심원사	心源寺	NK North Hwanghae	Yŏntan-gun	Silla	
	Singwangsa	신광사	神光寺	NK South Hwanghae	Haeju-si	?	
	Singyesa	신계사	神溪寺	NK Kangwon	Kosong-gun	519	
	Sinheungsa	신흥사	神興寺	SK Gangwon	Sokcho-si	650 circa	
*	Sogwangsa×	석왕사	釋王寺	NK Kangwon	Anbyon-gun	1386	
*	Songbulsa	성불사	成佛寺	NK North Hwanghae	Sariwon-si	898	
*	Songgwangsa	송광사	松廣寺	SK South Jeolla	Suncheon-si	867 and 1190	
	Sounsa	서운사	棲雲寺	NK North Pyongan	Nyongbyon County	1345	
	Ssanggyesa	쌍계사	雙磎寺	SK South Gyeongsang	Hadong-gun	772	
	Sudeoksa	수덕사	修德寺	SK South Chungcheong	Yesan-gun	1308	
	Tapsa	탑사	塔寺	SK North Jeolla	Jinan-gun	1885	
	Tongdoksa	동덕사	東德寺	NK South Hamgyong	Tanchon-si	Goryeo	
*	Tongdosa	통도사	通度寺	SK South Gyeongsang	Yangsan-si	646	
	Unjusa	운주사	雲住寺	SK South Jeolla	Hwasun-gun	Unified Silla	
*	Wibongsa	위봉사	威鳳寺	SK North Jeolla	Wanju County	604	
*	Woljeongsa	월정사	月精寺	SK Gangwon	Pyeongchang-gun	643	
	Woljongsa (Anak)	월정사	月精寺	NK South Hwanghae	Anak-gun	846	
	Wonmyongsa	원명사	圓明寺	NK North Hwanghae	Kumchon County	Goryeo	
	Yanghwasa	양화사	陽和寺	NK North Pyongan	Taechon-gun	872	
	Yeonghwasa	영화사	永華寺	SK Seoul	Gwangjin District	672	
	Yeonjuam	연주암	戀主庵	SK Gyeonggi	Gwacheon	677	
*	Yongjusa	용주사	龍珠寺	SK Gyeonggi	Hwaseong-si	854	
*	Yongmyongsa×	영명사	永明寺	NK Pyongyang	Moranbong-guyok	392	
*	Yujomsa×	유점사	楡岾寺	NK Kangwon	Kumgang-gun	550 circa and 1168	

== See also ==
- Buddhist temples in Korea
- List of Buddhist temples in South Korea
- List of Buddhist temples in Seoul
