= List of Buddhist temples in South Korea =

This is a list of Buddhist temples in South Korea for which there are Wikipedia articles, sorted by location. There are about 20,000 Buddhist temples in South Korea.

== Daejeon ==
- Musangsa

== Gyeonggi ==
- Bongseonsa
- Silleuksa
- Yongjusa

== Gangwon ==
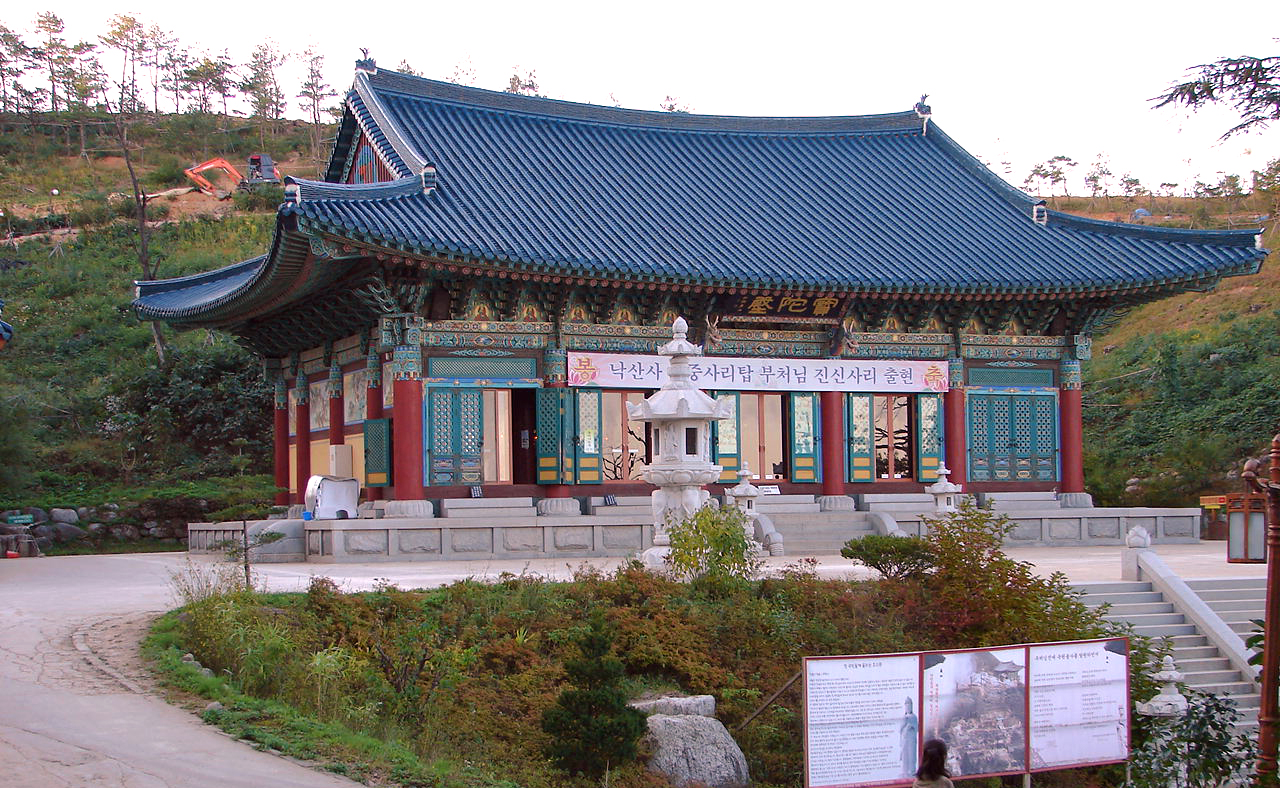
Naksansa

- Cheongpyeongsa
- Naksansa
- Oseam
- Sinheungsa
- Woljeongsa

== North Chungcheong ==
- Beopjusa
- Guinsa

== South Chungcheong ==
- Magoksa
- Sudeoksa

== North Gyeongsang ==
- Bulguksa (including Seokguram)
- Bunhwangsa
- Donghwasa
- Hwangnyongsa
- Jikjisa

== South Gyeongsang ==
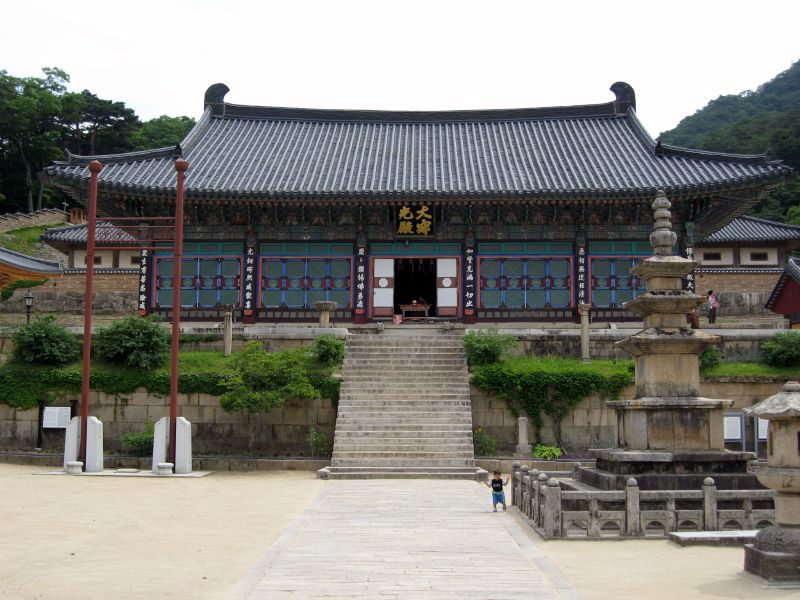
Haeinsa

- Beomeosa
- Busan
- Haeinsa (one of the Three Jewel Temples)
- Ssanggyesa
- Tongdosa (one of the Three Jewel Temples)

== Jeju ==
- Gwaneumsa

== North Jeolla ==
- Geumsansa
- Miruk-sa
- Seonunsa

== South Jeolla ==
- Hwaeomsa
- Songgwangsa (one of the Three Jewel Temples)
- Hyangiram Hermitage

== Seoul ==
- Bongeunsa
- Bongwonsa
- Jogyesa

== See also ==
- Buddhism in South Korea
- Korean Buddhist temples
- List of Buddhist temples in Korea
- Temple Stay
