= 觀音寺 =

觀音寺, 観音寺 may refer to:

- Kannon-ji (disambiguation)
- Gwaneumsa (disambiguation)
- Guanyin Temple (disambiguation)
