= Gwaneumsa =

Gwaneumsa or Kwanumsa can refer to various Korean Buddhist temples:

- Gwaneumsa (Seoul), in Gwanak-gu, Seoul
- Gwaneumsa (Jeju City), in Jeju City
- Kwanumsa (Kaesong) in Kaesŏng
