= Geonbongsa =

Buddhist temple in Goseong, South Korea

Geonbong Temple

Religion
- Affiliation: Buddhism

Location
- Location: Naengcheon-ri, Geojin-eup, Goseong County, Gangwon-do
- Country: South Korea
- Interactive map of Geonbong Temple
- Coordinates: 38.40332°N 128.3781°E

Architecture
- Elevation: 199 m (653 ft)

Website
- geonbongsa.org

Korean name
- Hangul: 건봉사
- Hanja: 乾鳳寺
- RR: Geonbongsa
- MR: Kŏnbongsa

Geonbongsa (Korean: 건봉사) is a temple located in Goseong County, Gangwon Province, South Korea.

There is another temple with the same name located in 37.7334°N 128.0805°E.

It is commonly referred to as 'Geumgangsan Geonbongsa Temple' at the south-eastern foot of Gambong Peak on Mount Geonbong, where the Geumgangsan stem begins. The area is in the northernmost part of the Korean Peninsula because it is near the border.

It is said that the temple was built and called Wongaksa in 520th, the seventh year of King Beopheung of Silla, and this area was Goguryeo's territory at that time, so it is considered a legend like the founding legend related to most temples built during the Three Kingdoms period. There is a record of important Buddhist events and important construction since the period of the two Koreas. In the early Goryeo dynasty, Doseon, a teacher of King Taejo of Goryeo, reconstructed Wongaksa Temple, and there was a phoenix-shaped stone on the west side of the temple. In 1358, during the reign of King Gongmin at the end of the Goryeo dynasty, Naong was renamed Geonbongsa after being reconstructed.

During the reign of King Sejo of the Joseon dynasty, it was designated as a Wondang and allowed King Sejo to perform his own activities to build Eosilgak, and continued to receive constant attention and support from the royal court throughout the Joseon dynasty. The tooth sarira of Sakyamuni, brought by Jajangyulsa from the Tang dynasty during the Silla dynasty, was originally located in Tongdosa Temple before being robbed during the Japanese Invasion of Korea in 1592. Ambassador Samyeong took it back from Japan and enshrined it in Geonbongsa Temple.

South Korea has one of the four major temples on the northern Japanese occupation, Gangwon Province and one Buddhist temple as big as one of the 31 base temples of representing Baedamsa Sinheungsa and, to the Naksansa temple. Jurisdiction, but third diocese headquarters located at the Jogye Order and destroyed by the Korean War (傳燈寺) are organized as a horse. At that time, the building, which was hundreds of square blocks in the bombing, was burnt down and destroyed, and now only the newly built buildings in modern times stand simply. Because of the location included in the civilian access control zone, civilians could come and go only for one day after Buddha's birthday for a long time after the Korean War. Full access was not allowed until 1989.

Geonbongsa Temple produced many Buddhist monks and continued its tradition as one of Korea's most famous Buddhist monks since the 10,000-day event of the Silla dynasty, in which people memorized wooden amitaburi and climbed to the heaven. It is also called the main mountain of Hoguk Buddhism because it was the place where Master Samyeong stayed during the Japanese Invasion of Korea in 1592.

Rainbow bridge constructed during the Joseon dynasty, hipped-and-gabled roof of the Japanese occupation and designated as treasures of the Republic of Korea is neungpagyo a mere scrap of paper, burimun (不二門) was during the Korean War. The only surviving child, a building in paragraph, Gangwon Province, cultural heritage materials were No 35.
