= Ryangchonsa =

- Hangul: 량천사
- Hanja: 梁泉寺
- RR: Ryangcheonsa
- MR: Ryangch'ŏnsa

The Ryangchon Buddhist Temple is located in Rakchol-li, Kowon County, South Hamgyong Province, North Korea.

The site was visited by Kim Jong-il on June 1, 2002, where he spoke of the importance of cultural preservation.

The temple consists of three buildings: Taeung Hall, Manse Pavilion and Muryangsu Hall, all of which were built in 753. The Taeung Hall was rebuilt in 1636 and Manse Pavilion in 1729. The Manse Pavilion is the biggest of the three. The Taeung Hall features detached paintings and a court dance painting on the inclined ceiling.
