= Samhwasa =

Buddhist temple in Gangwon, South Korea

- 삼화사
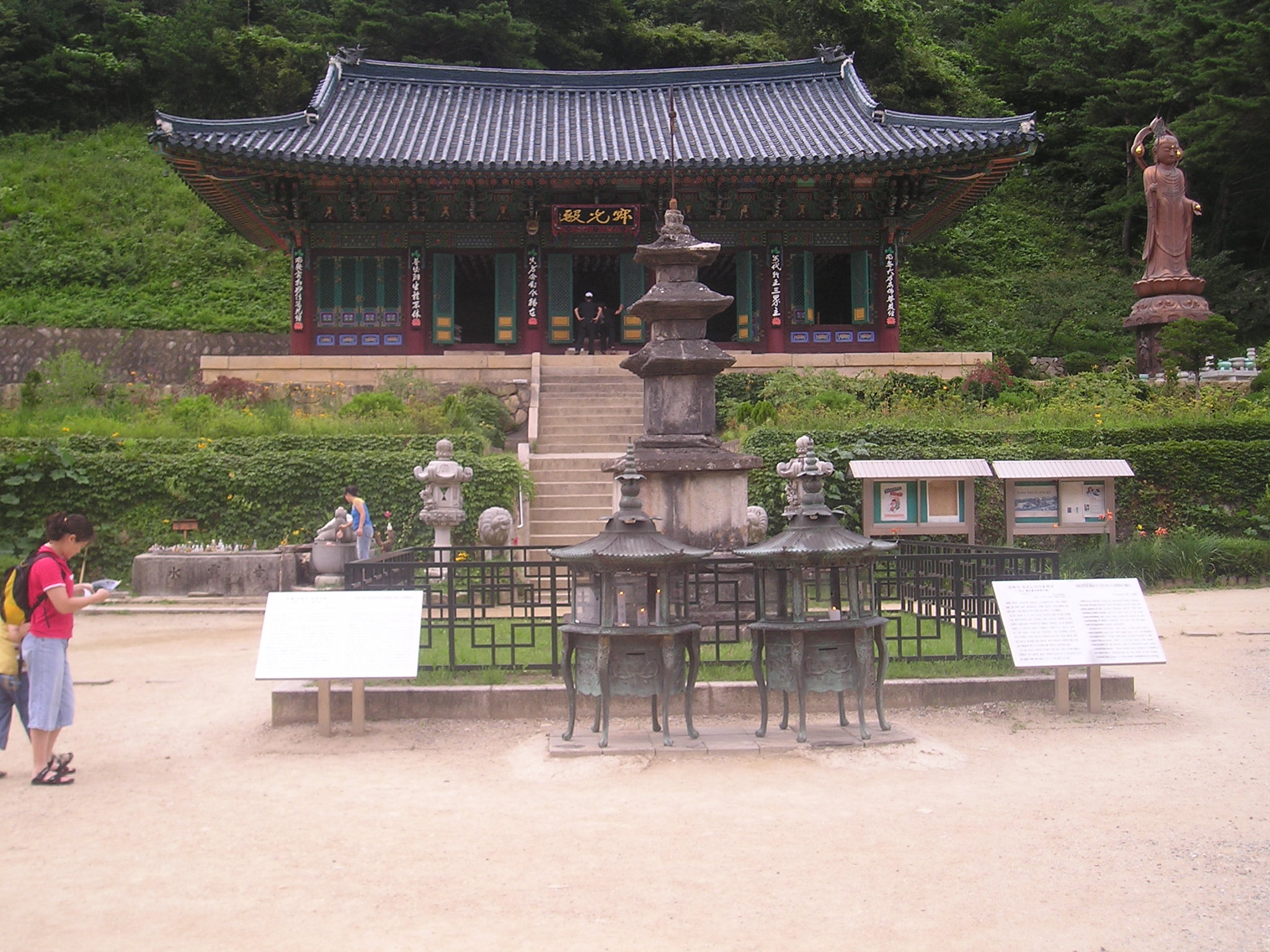
- Samhwasa Temple in South Korea

Religion
- Affiliation: Jogye Order of Korean Buddhism

Location
- Location: 584 Samhwa-ro (Samhwa-dong) Donghae city Gangwon Province (Korean: 강원도 동해시 삼화로 584(삼화동))
- Country: South Korea
- Interactive map of Samhwasa
- Coordinates: 37°27′47.9″N 129°00′51.6″E

Samhwasa (Korean: 삼화사; Hanja: 三和寺, Pronounced “Sam-hwa-sa”) is a Buddhist temple located in Gangwon, South Korea, affiliated with the Jogye Order of Korean Buddhism. Founded in 642 by Ven. Jajang Yulsa, the temple has undergone various transformations and played significant roles throughout Korean history. Its initial establishment as Heungnyeondae, later evolving into Samgongam Hermitage, reflects its shift from a doctrinal to a Seon School. The temple has been intricately linked with historical events, including prayers by Wang Geon for unification, and the water and land Ceremony following the establishment of Joseon. Despite suffering damages due to natural disasters and conflicts, including a fire set by the Japanese army in 1907, Samhwasa has been rebuilt and preserved, housing numerous cultural relics and national treasures. These include a Three-Story Stone Pagoda and an Iron Seated Rocana Buddha with significant historical and linguistic importance, showcasing the temple's cultural and historical significance in Korea.

== History ==
The Samhwasa Temple was established by Ven. Jajang Yulsa in 642. Initially named Heungnyeondae, it was renamed Samgongam Hermitage in 864 when National Preceptor Ven. Beomil Guksa reconstructed it, and the temple's role changed from being a doctrinal school to a Seon School. It was in Samgongam Hermitage that Wang Geon, the future King Taejo of Goryeo, prayed for the unification of the later three kingdoms. When he achieved unification, he renamed the temple Samhwasa (lit. “Harmony of the Three” Temple) to symbolize the hope that Goryeo, Later Baekje, and Silla would end their ongoing conflict and coexist in harmony.

When Yi Seong-gye founded Joseon after destroying Goryeo's regal power, he had King Gongyang and the last of his followers drowned in the ocean in front of Samcheok. To console their spirits, Samhwasa Temple was tasked with offering the Water and Land Ceremony (Suryukjae) after the founding of Joseon.

Later, in 1747, Samhwasa Temple was damaged by floods and landslides. After relocating to a higher site, it was destroyed by fire in 1820, but was reconstructed again in 1824. In 1907, the temple was torched by the Japanese army under the pretext that some militia men were staying there. Many buildings, including the Main Buddha Hall and Seon Hall, about 200 bays in size, were destroyed.

There are many historical relics and legends related to Samhwasa Temple. The Jewang Ungi (帝王韻紀; Songs of Emperors and Kings) was written by Yi Seung-hyu, who promoted a spirit of nationalism in the later Goryeo era. After concentrating on reading sutras for 10 years in his house, he then donated it to Samhwasa Temple; it was later transformed into Ganjangam Hermitage.

== Cultural properties ==
Samhwasa Temple's cultural heritage includes a Three-Story Stone Pagoda (Treasure No. 1277), an Iron Seated Rocana Buddha (Treasure No. 1292), the stupa of Ven. Sangjun Daesa, and the stupa and stele of Ven. Wongokdang Daeseonsa. The Three-Story Stone Pagoda, standing 4.95 meters (16 feet) high and dating from the Goryeo era, radiates stability with its well-balanced proportions.

The Rocana Buddha is an iron Buddha produced during the Unified Silla era. Initially thought to be a Medicine Buddha, it was later discovered, through an inscribed text found on its back, to be a Rocana Buddha (盧舍那佛) created in the mid-9th century. The text, inscribed in Idu script—an archaic writing system that represents the Korean language using Chinese characters—provides an actual example of Idu script, used around the 10th century. This makes the statue significantly meaningful in terms of Korean linguistics. It was designated Treasure No. 1292 in 1998.

== Tourism ==
It also offers temple stay programs where visitors can experience Buddhist culture.

== Gallery ==
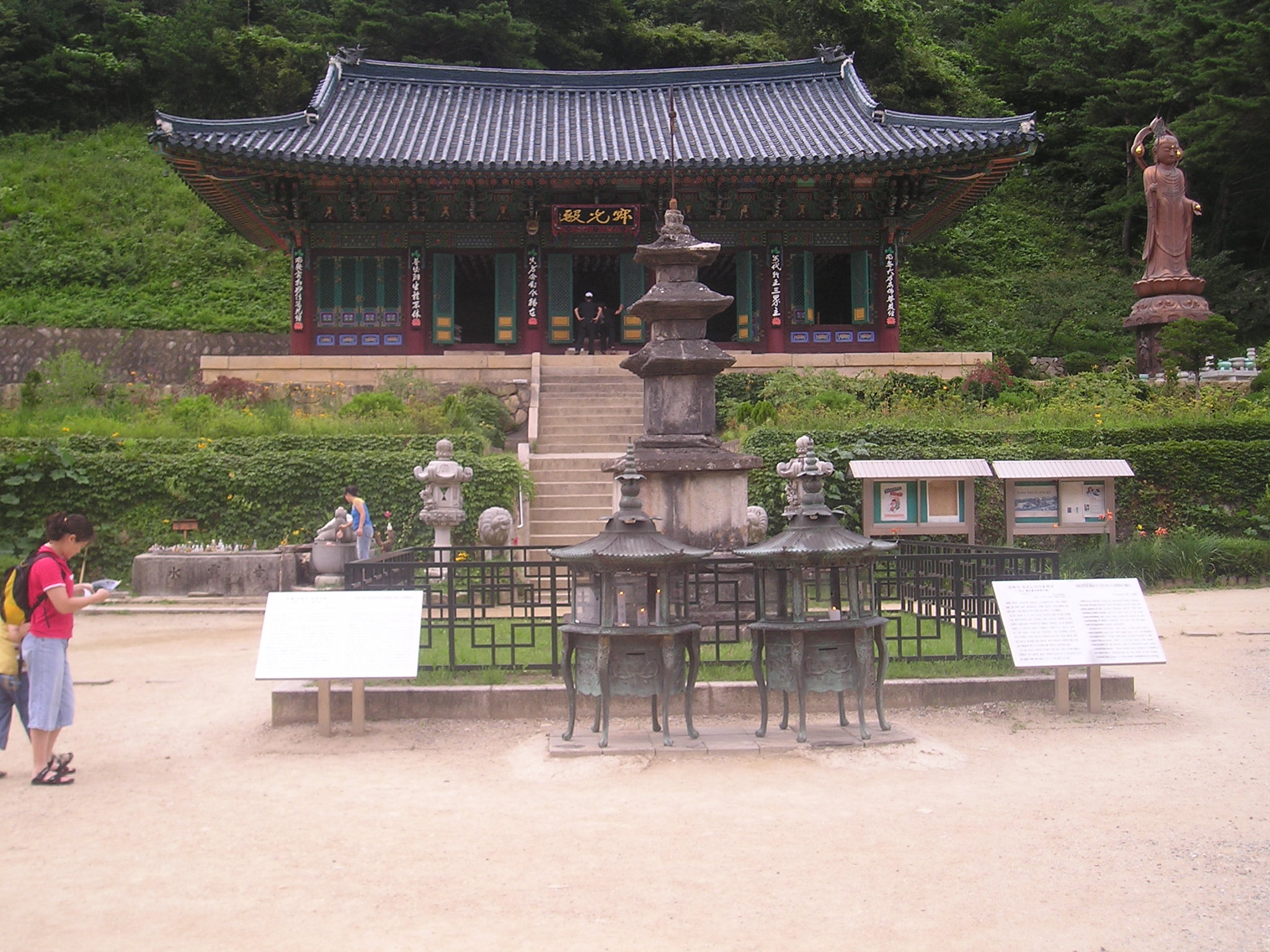

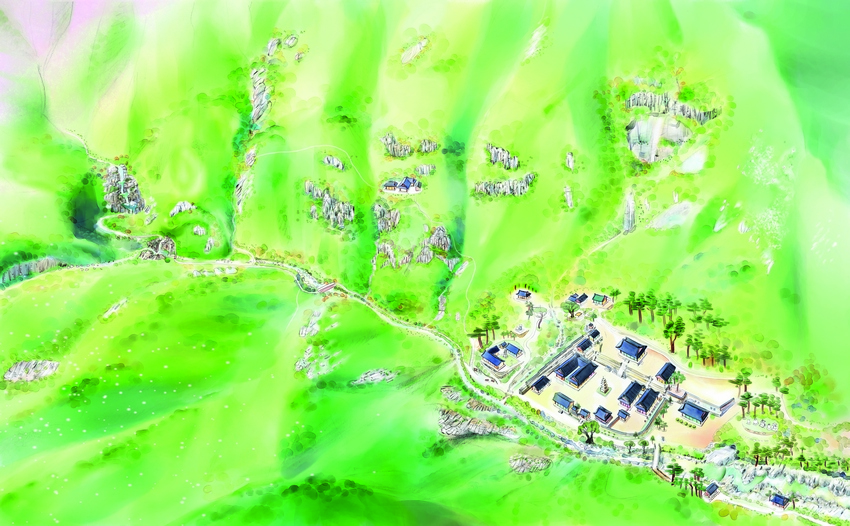

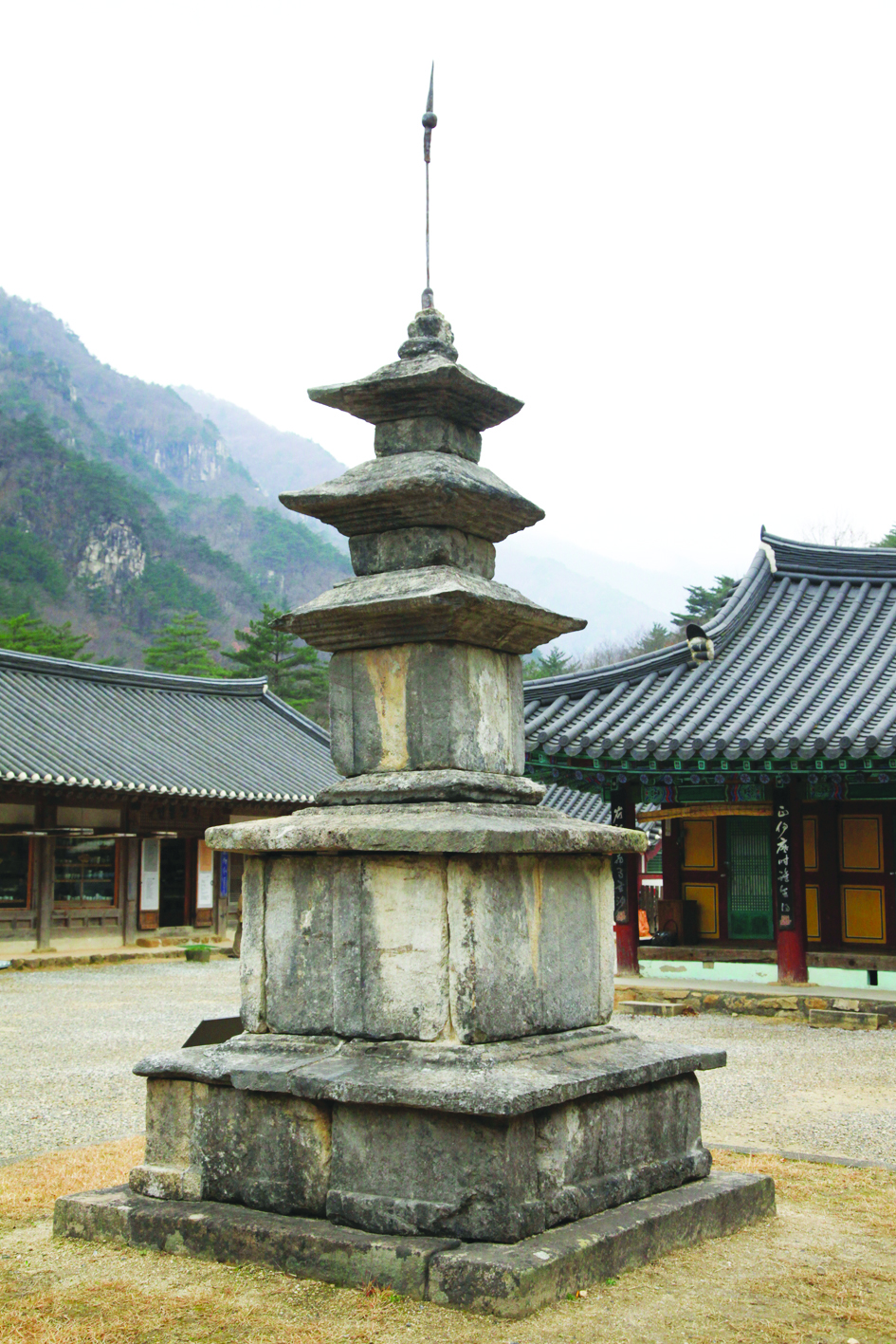

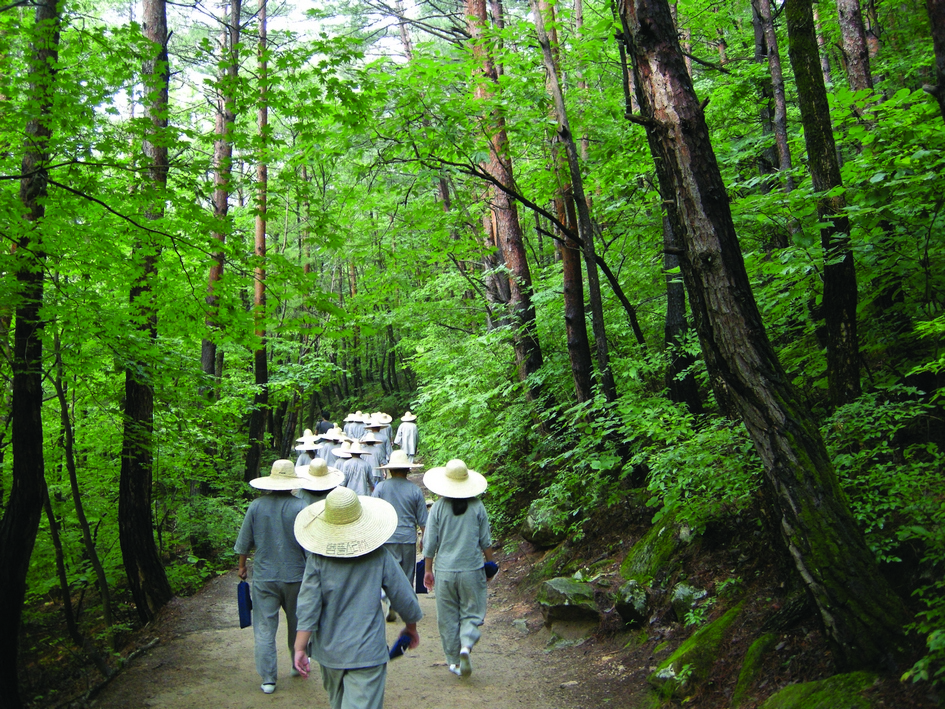
