= Kwijusa =

Korean Buddhist temple in Hamju-gun, North Korea

Coordinates: 39.947258°N 127.674998°E

Kwijusa (Korean: 귀주사; Hanja: 歸州寺) is a Korean Buddhist temple located on Seolbongsan Mountain in Hamju-gun, North Korea. It is said to have been established during the reign of King Munjong of Goryeo. During the Japanese colonial period, this temple was designated as one of the 31 head temples. The resulting pyramidal hierarchy was supposed to take control over the Korean Buddhism.
