= Manchu invasion of Korea =

During the 17th century, there were two Manchu invasions of Korea:

- Later Jin invasion of Joseon (1627)
- Qing invasion of Joseon (1636 – 1637)
