= Bongseonsa =

Korean temple

Coordinates: 37°44′50″N 127°11′00″E

- Main hall

Korean name
- Hangul: 봉선사
- Hanja: 奉先寺
- RR: Bongseonsa
- MR: Pongsŏnsa

Bongseonsa is a head temple of the Jogye Order of Korean Buddhism. It stands in Jinjeop-eup, Namyangju, a short distance east of Seoul in Gyeonggi province, South Korea. It was built by National Preceptor Beobin in 969, under the Goryeo dynasty. At that time it bore the name "Unaksa." The current name dates to 1469, when Queen Jeonghui of the Joseon Dynasty changed the temple's name at the time that her husband King Sejo was buried nearby. The name can be interpreted as "temple of revering the sage." Thereafter, the temple continued to have a close relationship with the queens of Joseon.

Bongseonsa has been burned down and rebuilt several times, due to the 16th-century Seven Year War, 17th-century Manchu invasions of Korea, and 20th-century Korean War.

== See also ==
- Korean Buddhist temples
- Religion in South Korea
