= Silsangsa =

Buddhist temple in Namwon, South Korea

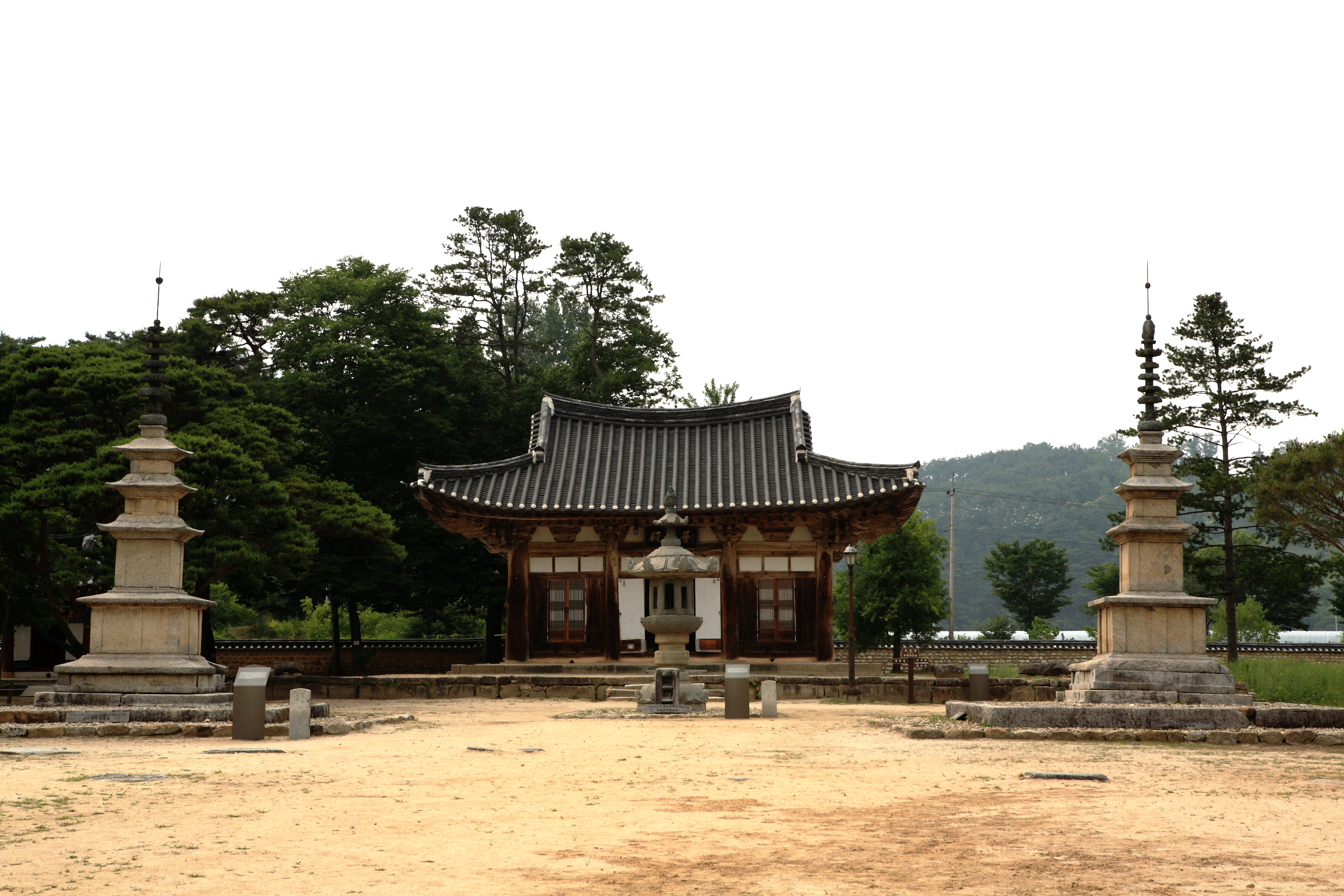
- Silsangsa

- Location within South Korea

Religion
- Affiliation: Buddhism
- Sect: Jogye Order

Location
- Location: Namwon, North Jeolla Province, South Korea
- Country: South Korea
- Coordinates: 35°24′N 127°36′E

Architecture
- Historic Sites of South Korea
- Official name: Silsangsa Temple, Namwon
- Designated: 1984-10-19
- Reference no.: 309

Silsangsa (Korean: 실상사; Hanja: 實相寺) is a temple of the Jogye Order located in Namwon, North Jeolla Province, South Korea. The temple is a branch temple of the Geumsan Temple in Iksan. Although the temple is legally situated in Namwon, it is also quite near the Hamyang county of South Gyeongsang Province. It is exceptional since this temple is in a field, as opposed to most Korean temples, which are located in mountainous areas.

It is said that the temple was constructed in the era of Heungdeok of Silla by the great monk Hongcheok (Korean: 홍척; Hanja: 洪陟, fl. 830), a student of Zhiyi, after he returned from Tang China. Since the king himself showed deep faith and devoted himself with the Crown Prince in this temple, the place became highly celebrated, eventually becoming the founding location of the Silsang school of Chan Buddhism. Silsangsa is the oldest temple among the Nine mountain schools.

The temple faced a period of decline during the Joseon era when the structures were destroyed by fire. From this point on, the temple was shut down, although it was later restored three times during the eras of Sukjong of Joseon, Sunjo of Joseon and Gojong of Korea. However, the temple never returned to its previous grand scale.

The Korean War harmed parts of the temple, as fighting forces often passed through the area, but most of the cultural relics remained intact.

== Cultural relics ==
The three-tier stone pagoda in the temple is registered as National Treasures of South Korea 10. Also designated as treasures are relics from the Silla era. A Buddha statue on site is 3 metres (9.8 ft) tall, the largest stele in the Korean Peninsula. The turtle stele for Monk Jeunggak is also registered.

== Gallery ==
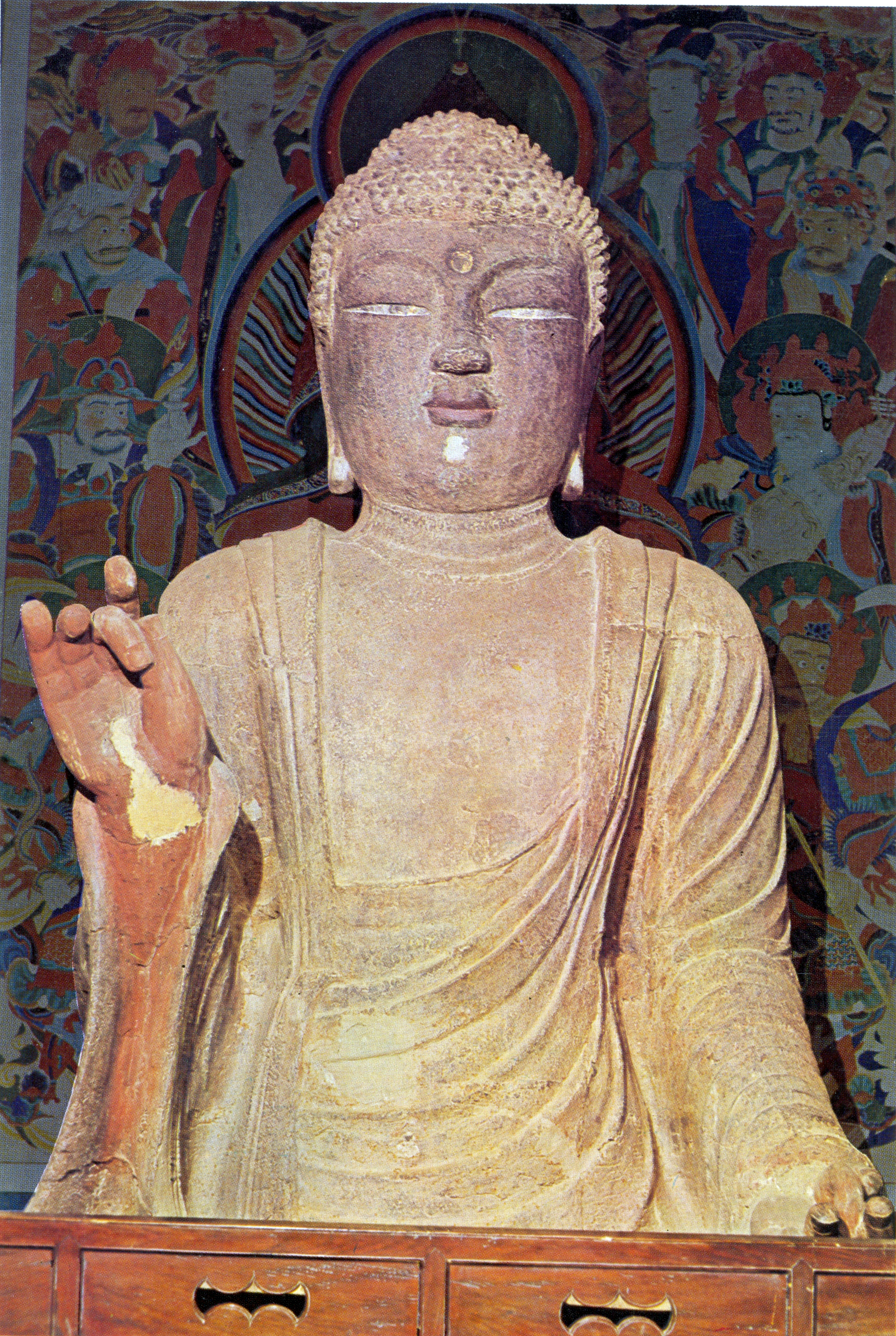
Seated iron Buddha

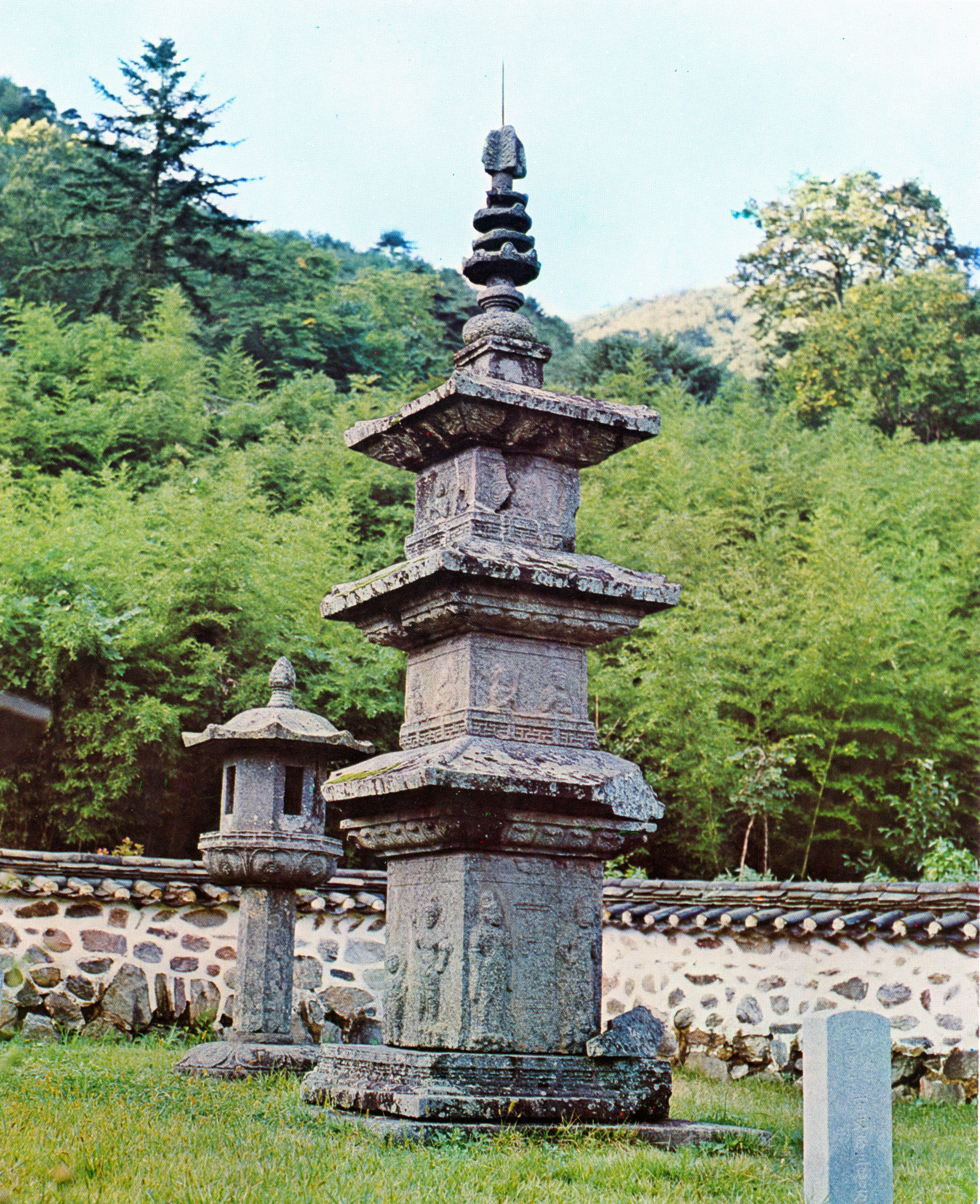
The three-storey pagoda at the site

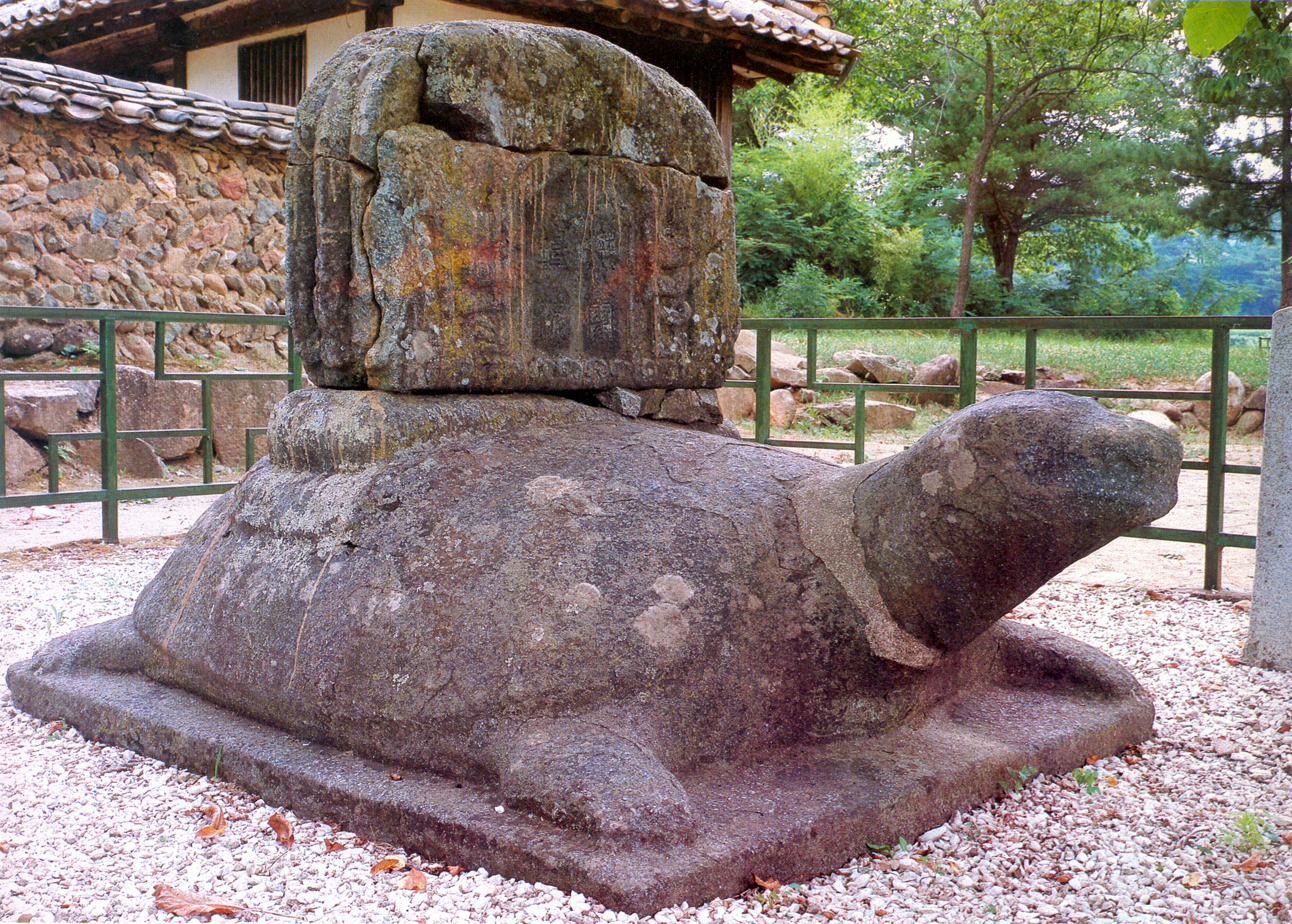
Stele for Monk Jeunggak

== Notes ==
- 실상사의 역사
- 실상사 철불에 녹이 스는 까닭? - <몸따라 마음따라 112>보물 제41호 '실상사 철제여래좌상'
