= Pagyesa =

Buddhist temple

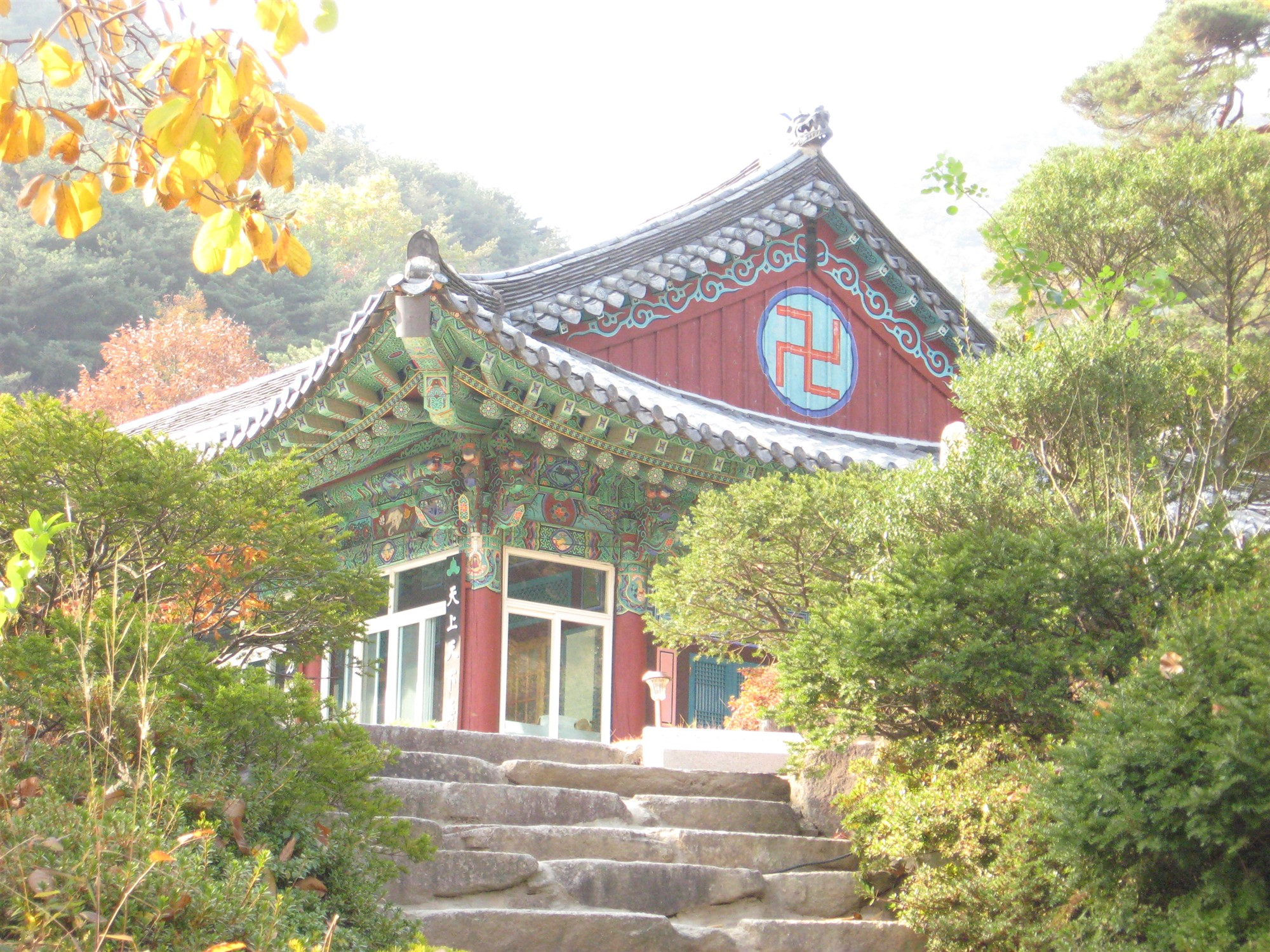
- : A temple building at Pagyesa, Palgong Mountain, Daegu, South Korea

- Location within South Korea

Religion
- Affiliation: Buddhism

Location
- Country: South Korea
- Interactive map of Pagyesa
- Coordinates: 36°00′04″N 128°38′28″E

Architecture
- Completed: 804

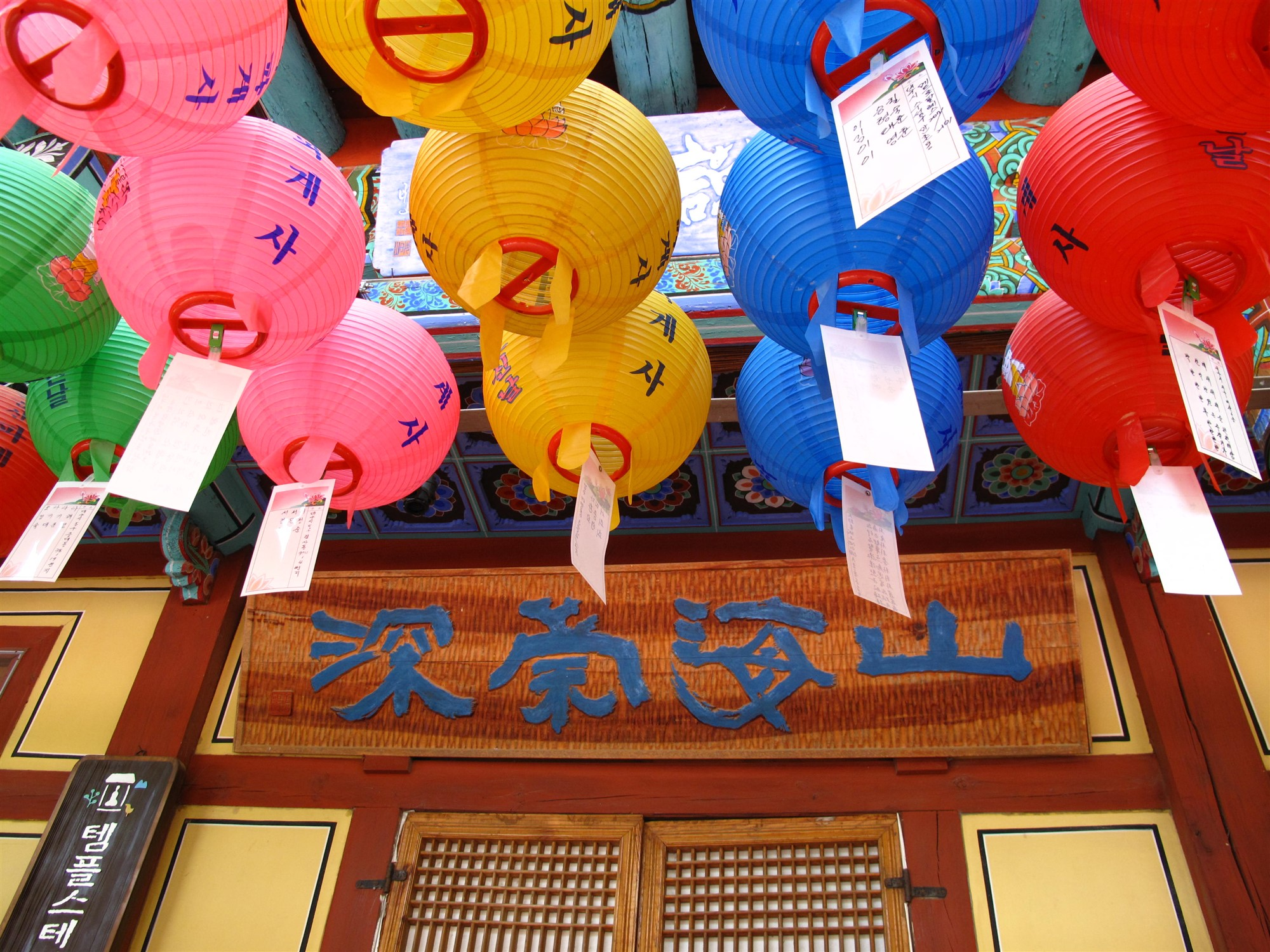
Buddha's Birthday paper lanterns at Pagyesa

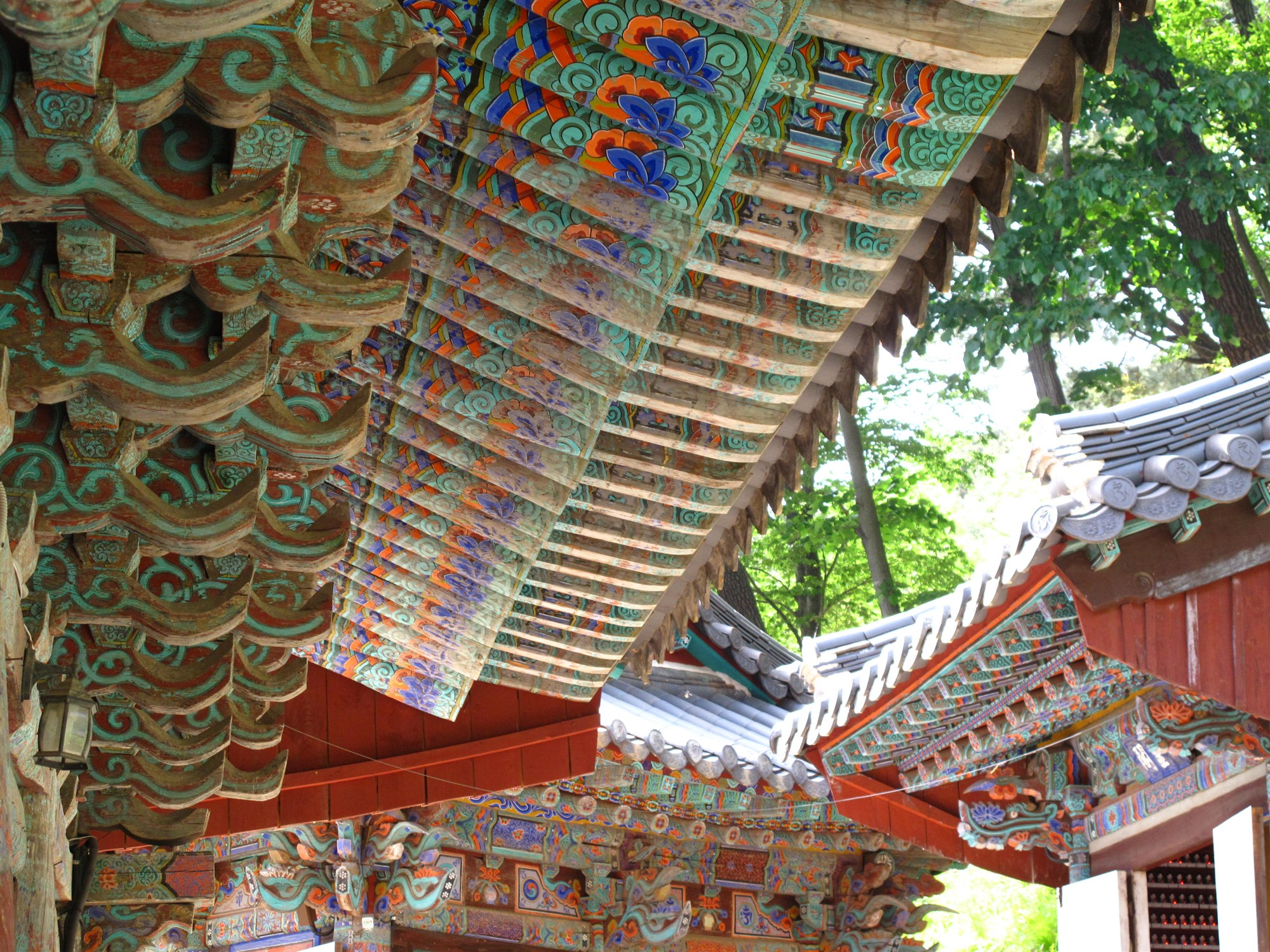
Pagyesa roof edge

Pagyesa (Korean: 파계사; Hanja: 把溪寺), or Pagye Temple, is a Buddhist temple on the mountain Palgongsan, near Daegu, South Korea. The temple was first built in 804 by a priest named Simji, and was restored and expanded in the 17th century.
