= Geumtapsa =

Geumtap Temple
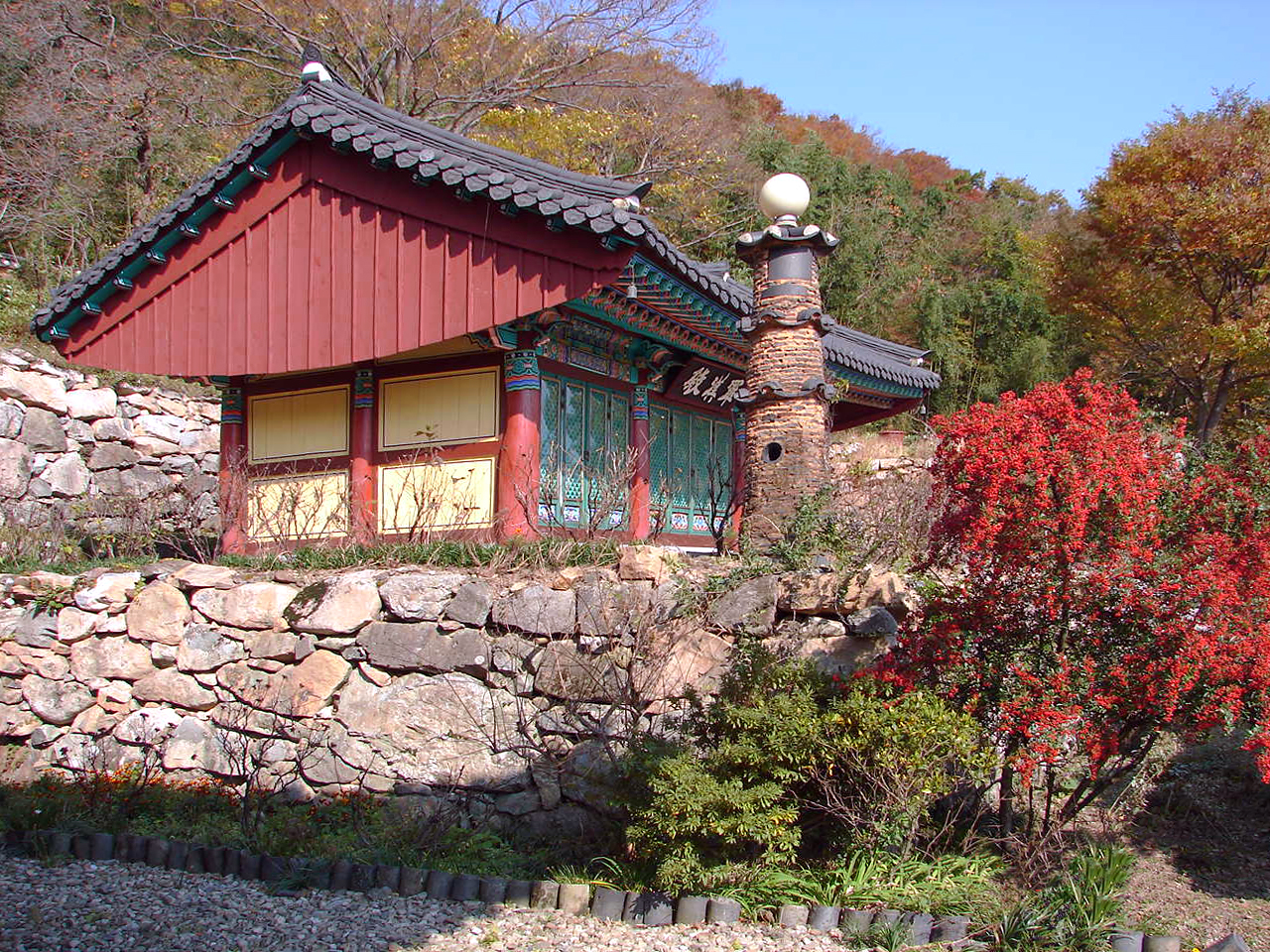
- One of the worship halls at Geumtapsa at the base of Mount Cheondeung

- Location within South Korea

Religion
- Affiliation: Buddhism

Location
- Location: Podu-myeon, Goheung-gun (county), Jeollanam-do (province), South Korea
- Country: South Korea
- Coordinates: 34.5427801°N 127.2876513°E

Korean name
- Hangul: 금탑사
- RR: Geumtapsa
- MR: Kŭmt'apsa

Geumtapsa or Geumtap Temple (Heavenly-Lantern Mountain Golden-Pagoda Temple), a Korean Buddhist Temple, is located at the base of Cheondeungsan (mountain) in Podu-myeon (township), Goheung-gun (county), Jeollanam-do (province), South Korea. The temple is known for being a Bhikkhuni (Buddhist nun) refuge and is affiliated with the Jogye Order of Korean Buddhism.

== Origin ==
Originally built in the 7th century by Buddhist Monk Wonhyo, Geumtapsa dates back to the Three Kingdoms period (57BC - AD668) when it was established as a branch of Songgwangsa (Temple).

== Treasures ==
=== Tangible Cultural Property #102 (Goheung-gun) ===
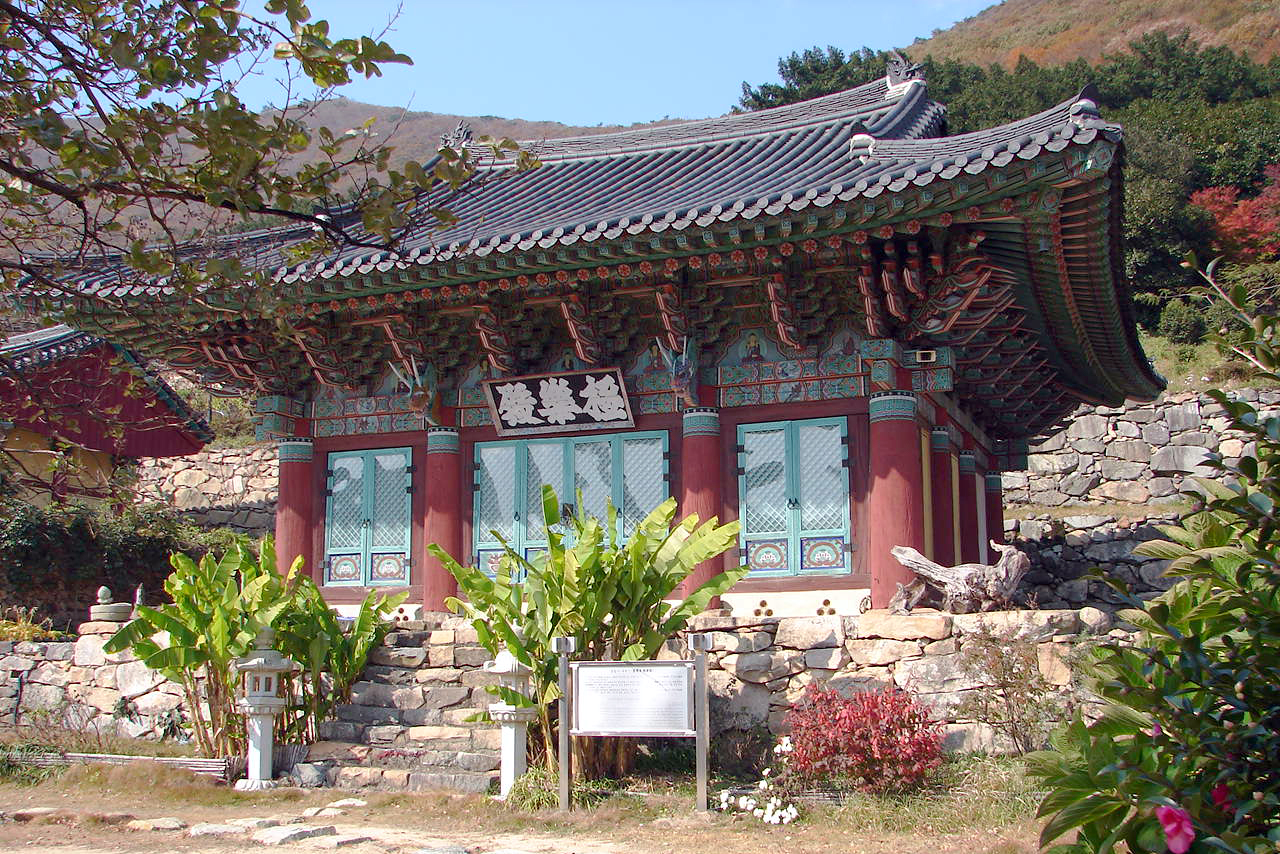
Geungnakjeon (Hall), Tangible Cultural Property #102 (Goheung-gun).

Geungnakjeon Hall of Geumtapsa Temple (Geumtapsageungnakjeon) is constructed in the style of the later years of the Joseon period (1392–1910).

It is said to have been burned down in 1597 during Imjin wars and to have been reconstructed in 1604. Records show that the building was either repaired or rebuilt in 1846, the 12th year of the reign of Joseon's King Heonjong (1849-63).

Geungnakjeon has a hipped-and-gabled roof with the eaves of the roof being supported by clusters of brackets. The multi-bracketing is typical of late-Joseon architecture.

Geungnakjeon has a Sanshin painting, the "Assembly of Spirits" where Sanshin (the Mountain Spirit), is depicted wearing a "flying scarf" like an immortal angel and holding a Daoist "peach of immortality", both of which are extremely rare (usually only features of his attendants).

Temple halls dedicated to Amitabha Buddha are usually named Geungnakjeon or Paradise Hall.

=== Natural Monument #239 ===
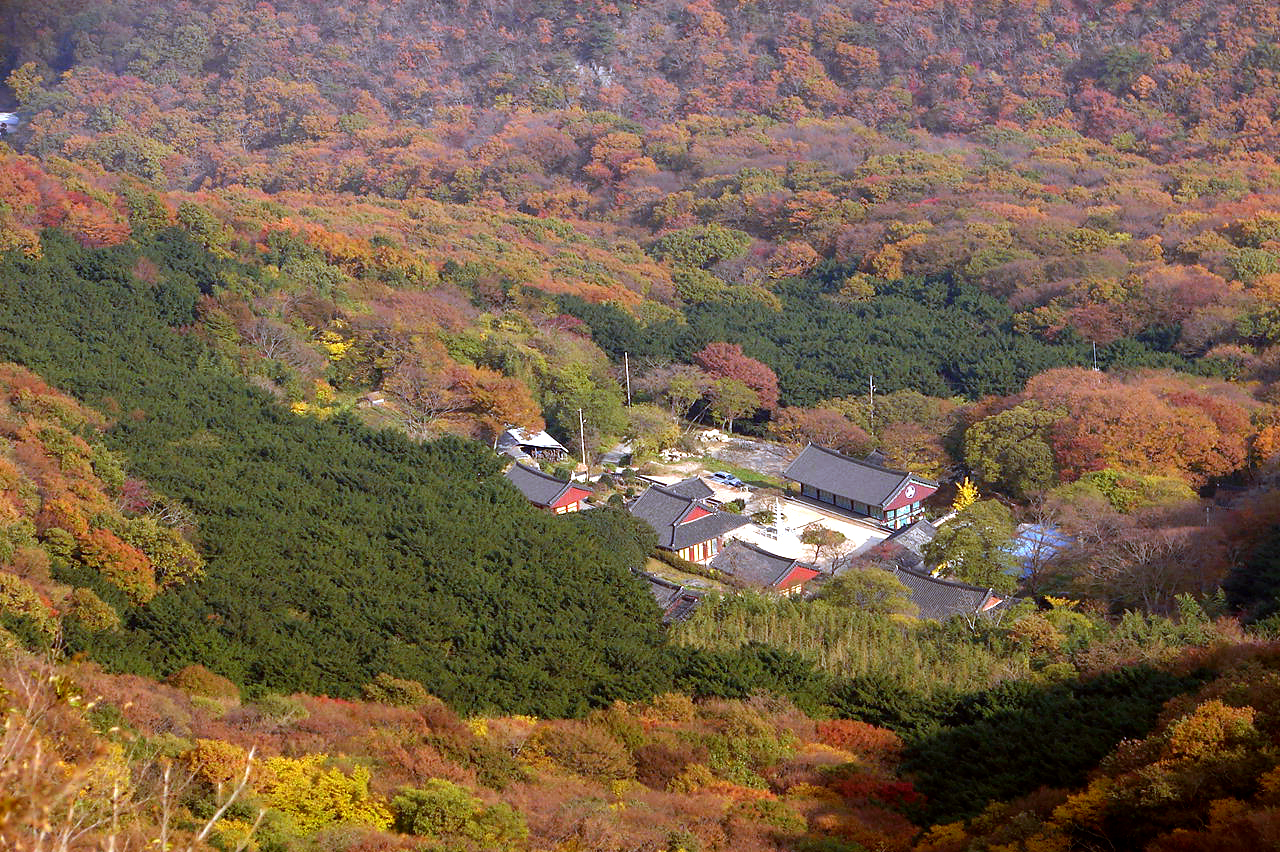
Geumtapsa at the foot of Cheondeungsan. The green surrounding the temple is the forest of Nutmeg Yew trees making up Natural Monument #239.

One of the more prominent features at Geumtapsa is the Forest of Nutmeg Yew (torreya nucifera) that surrounds the temple.

Nutmeg trees are only found in the southern part of Korea. Average height of trees found in the forest is 10m/33 ft but can grow to about 25m/82 ft in height. Its needle-like leaves are thick, small, and sharp at the point. These trees bloom in spring and bear long and round seeds in fall. A good source of lumber, the trees have gradually disappeared and now only a few groves in Jeju-do, and some areas of the Jeollabuk-do and Jeollanam-do (provinces), which have been designated Natural Monuments, remain.

This forest of nutmeg trees at Geumtapsa Temple is at the mid-slope level of Mt. Cheondeungsan and is said to have been planted in 637, the sixth year of Queen Seondeok ( 632–647) of the Silla Kingdom (57B.C.-A.D.935).

The forest of nutmeg trees at Geumtapsa Temple in Goheung is designated and conserved as a Natural Monument because of its great value to scientific research.

=== Treasure #1344 ===
Buddhist painting of Geumtapsa Temple (Geumtapsagwaebultaeng) is a painting, or gwaebul, from the King Jeongjo period of the Joseon Era depicting a unique composition with the three Buddhas of the past, present and future, flanked by major bosals depicted on a wide canvas.

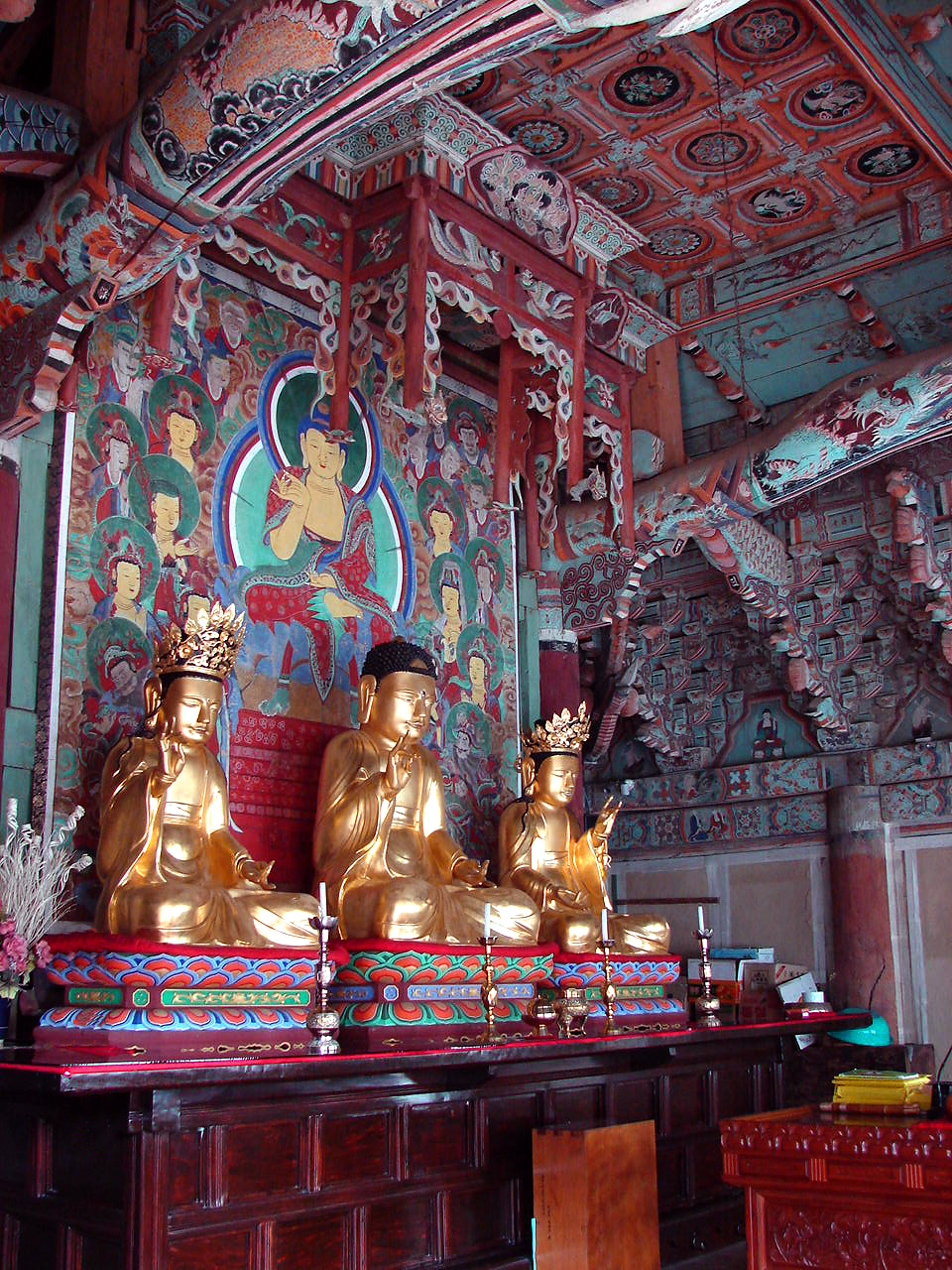
Buddhas in Geungnakjeon (Hall) - (not the gwaebul).

Gwaebul refers to a large Buddhist painting that is hung outside the temple hall for outdoor sermons during Buddhist ceremonies or services. The painting is enshrined in Geumtapsa Temple, and is 506 cm/16.6 ft in length and 648 cm/21.3 ft in width.

The composition of the painting is rather simple as only the major bosals are depicted, without guardians such as Sacheonwang (Four Guardian Kings). The painting is divided horizontally into three parts where each of the three Buddhas of the past, present and future are drawn on a large scale. The attendants are depicted at the top and bottom of the painting. The main Buddha is depicted with a genial face and small features.

The yukgye (protuberance on top of Buddha's head) is clearly shown in the shape of a sangtu (topknot) spread out to the side, and there is a large-sized gyeju (jeweled hair ornament) placed on top of the hair. The Buddha is depicted with broad, square shoulders and chigyeon (flower-shape decoration) around his right ankle.

The gwaebulgwe (storage box), in which the painting is stored, was made in 1697, around 100 years before the painting. The painting is a collaborative work of Bihyeon and Kwaeyun in the 2nd year of King Jeongjo of the Joseon Dynasty (1778).

It is an invaluable piece showing the characteristics of the paintings drawn in the late 18th century, such as the Buddha with small features and broad, square shoulders, a yukgye that is spread out to the side, a large-sized gyeju on top of the hair and a chigyeon around the ankle.

== Gallery ==
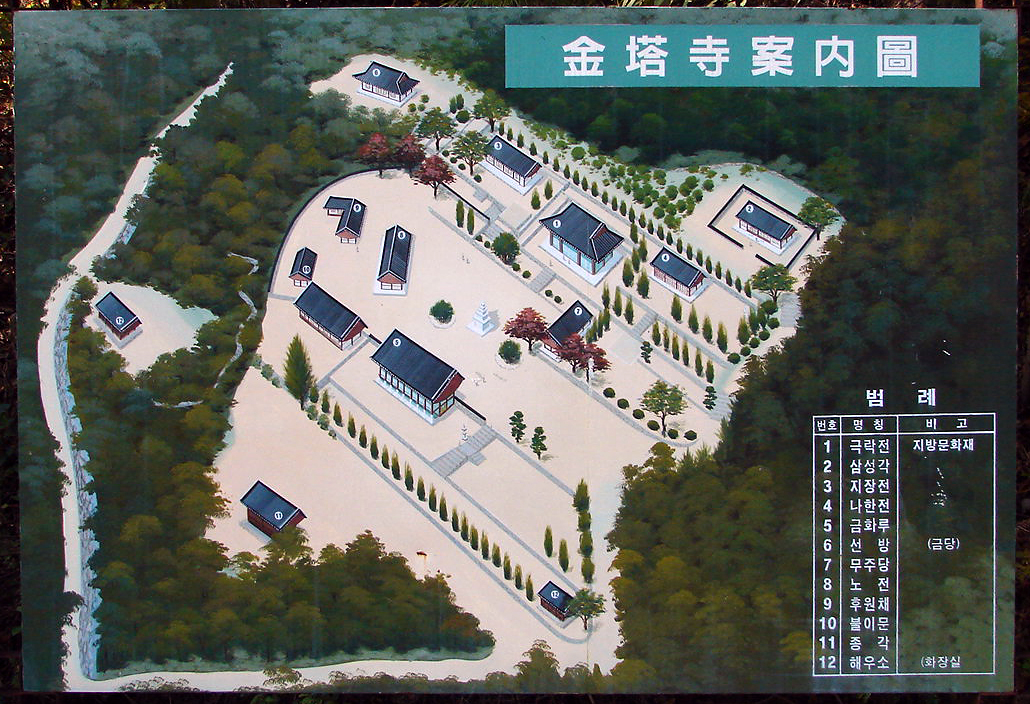

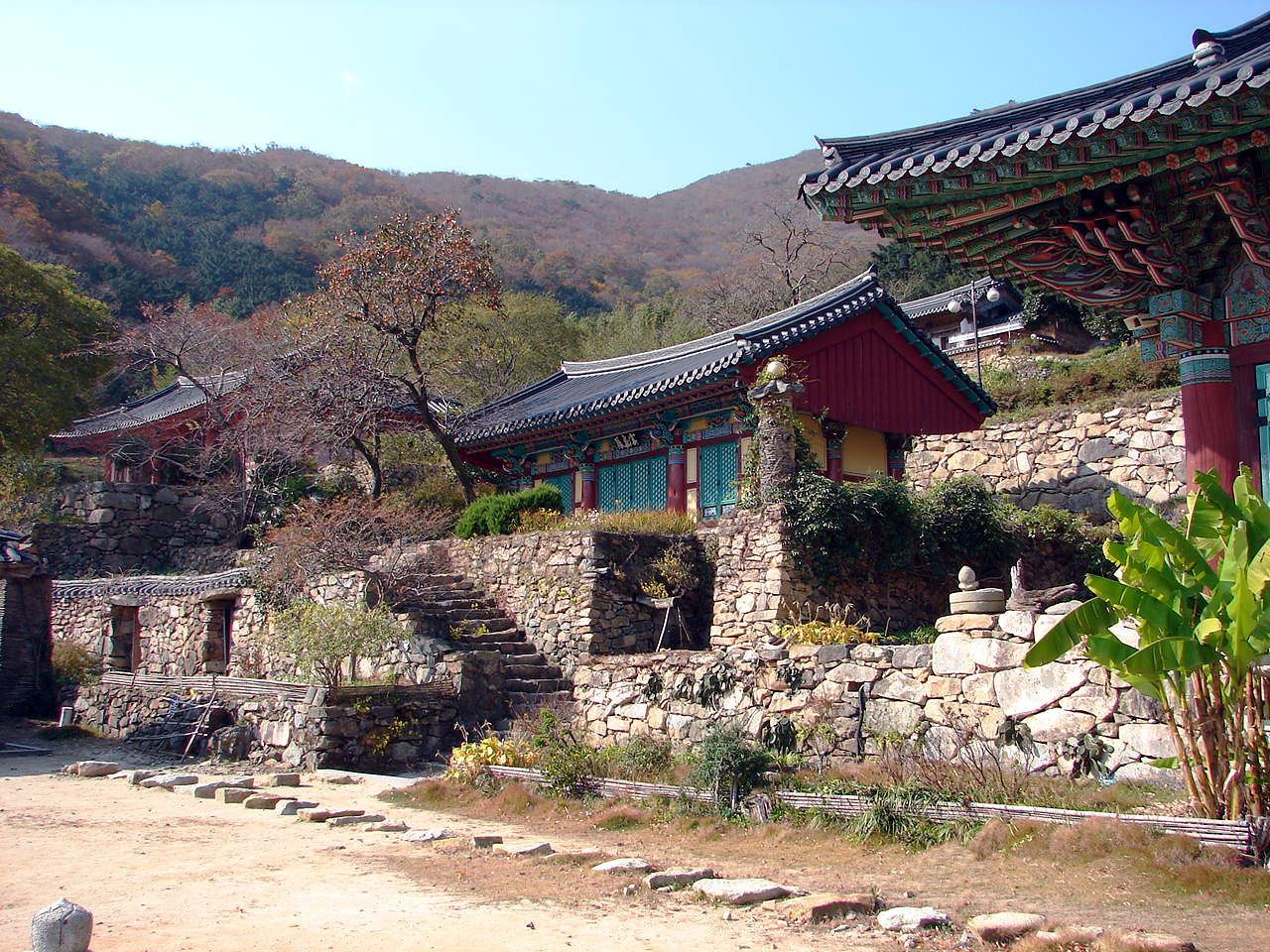

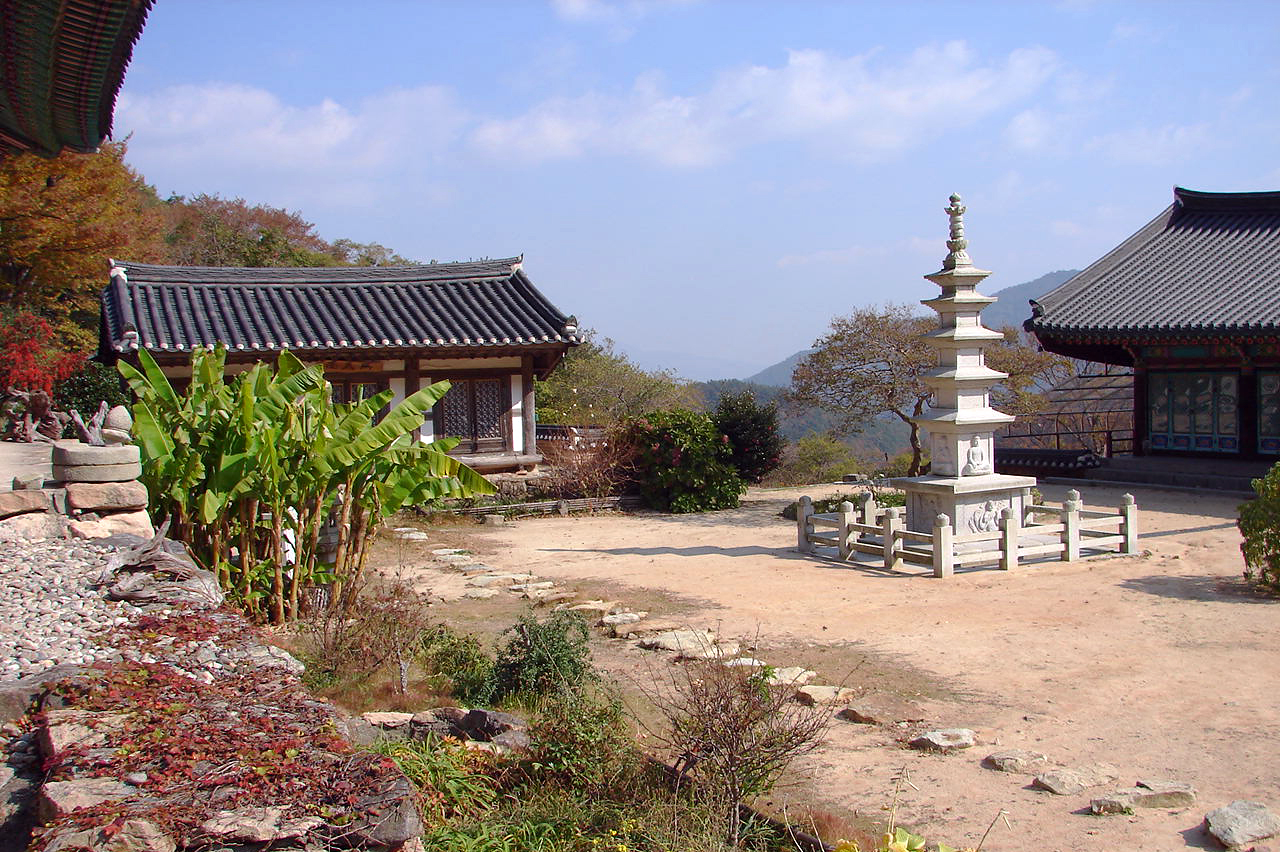

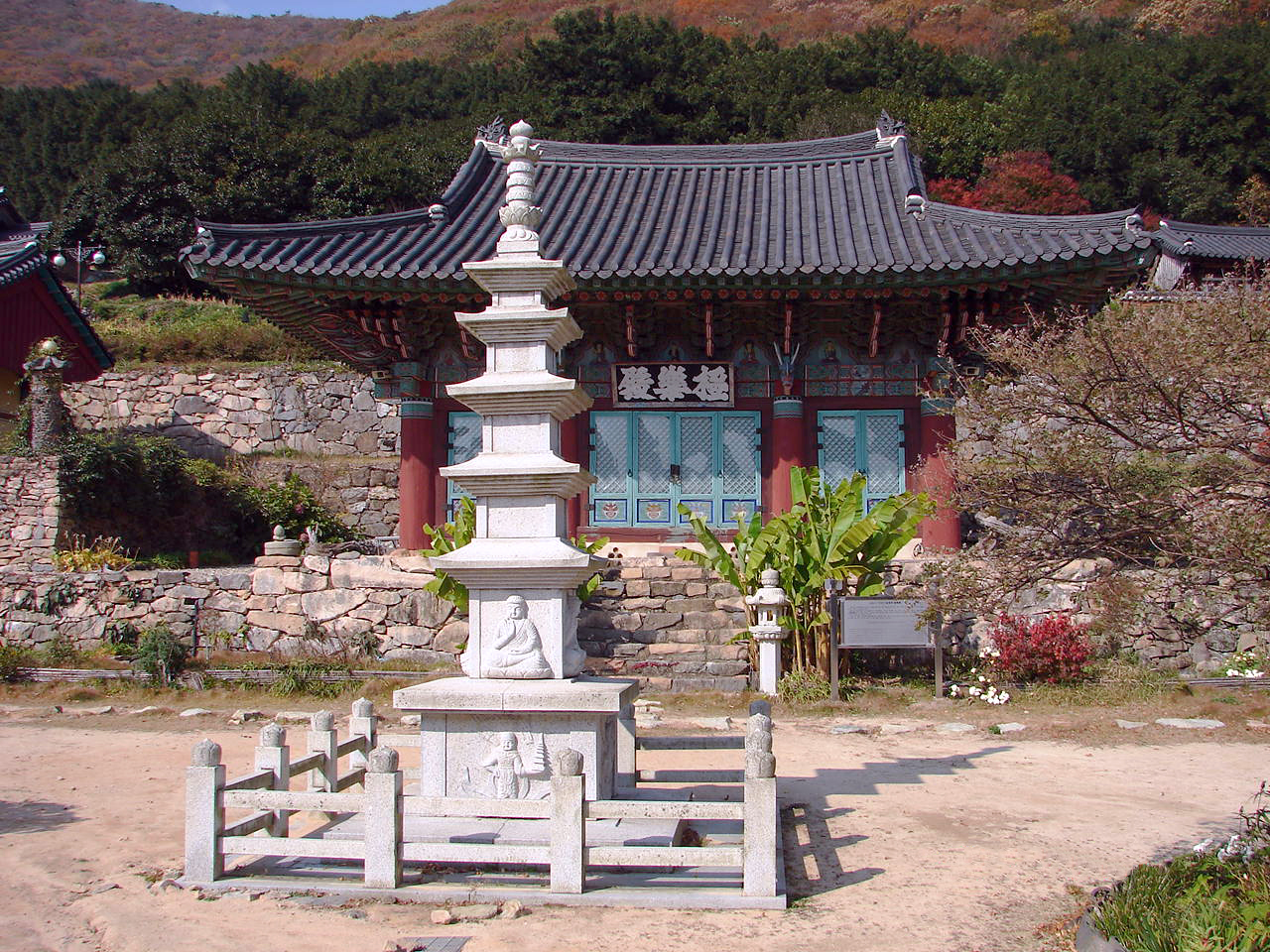

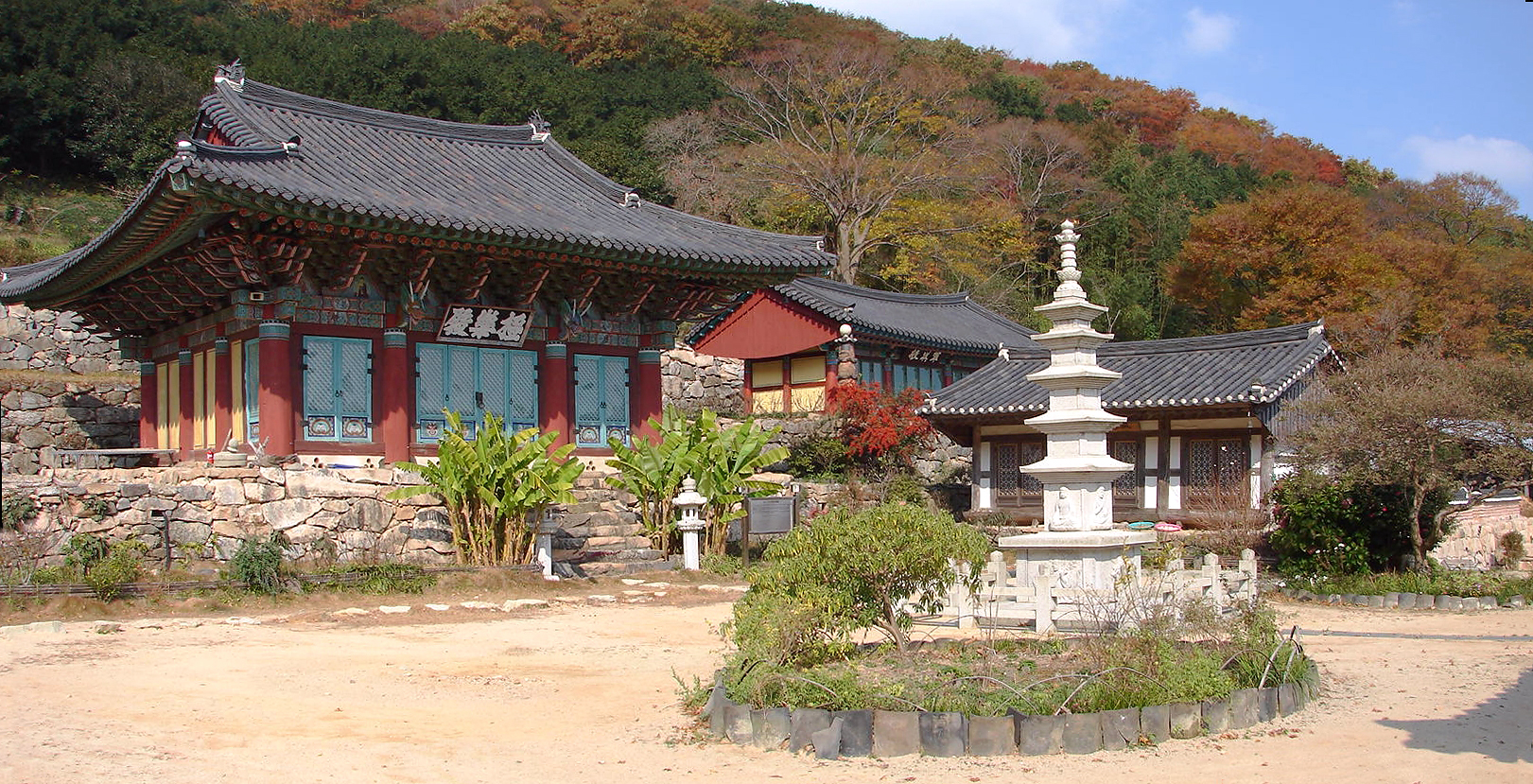

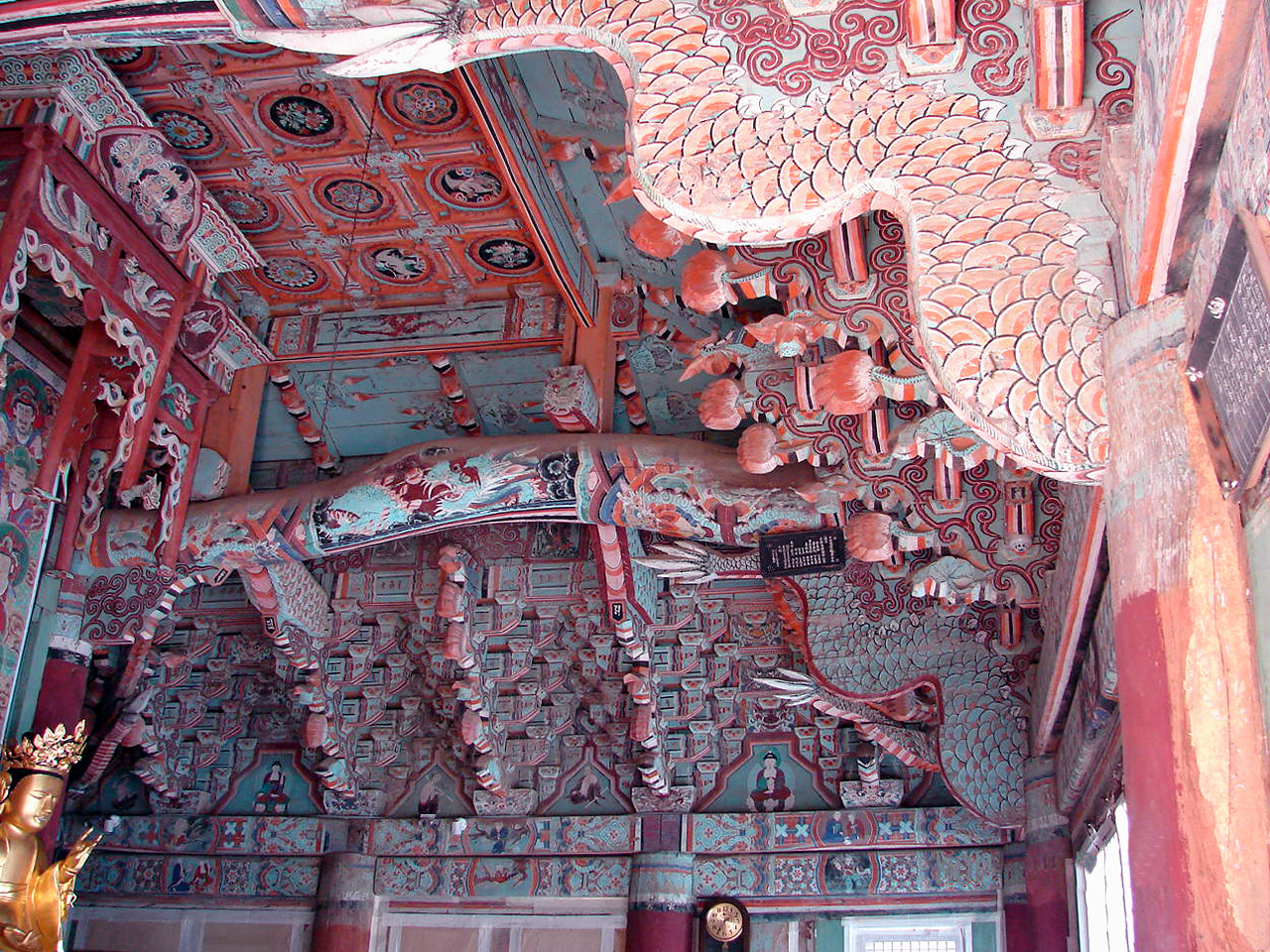

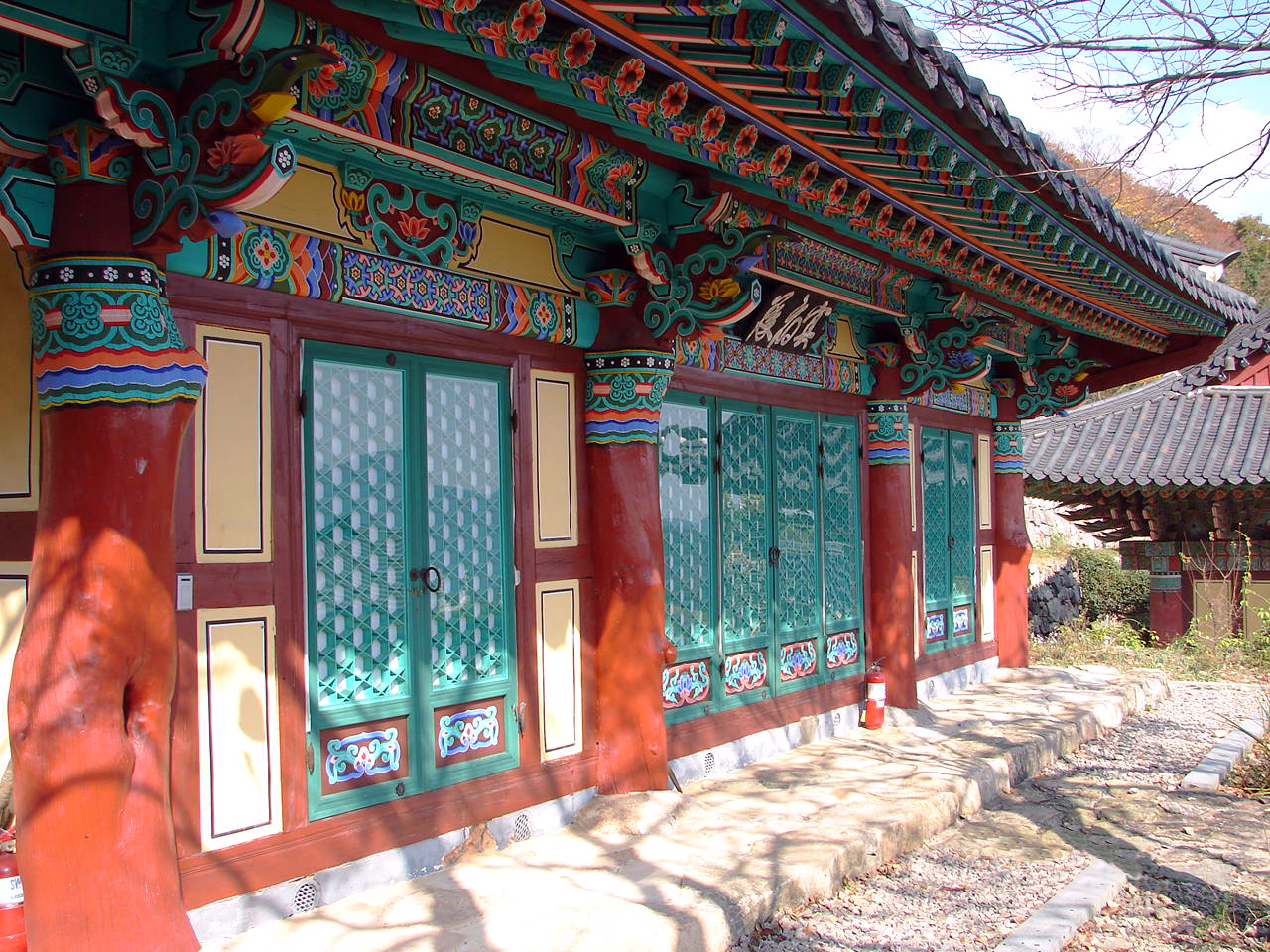

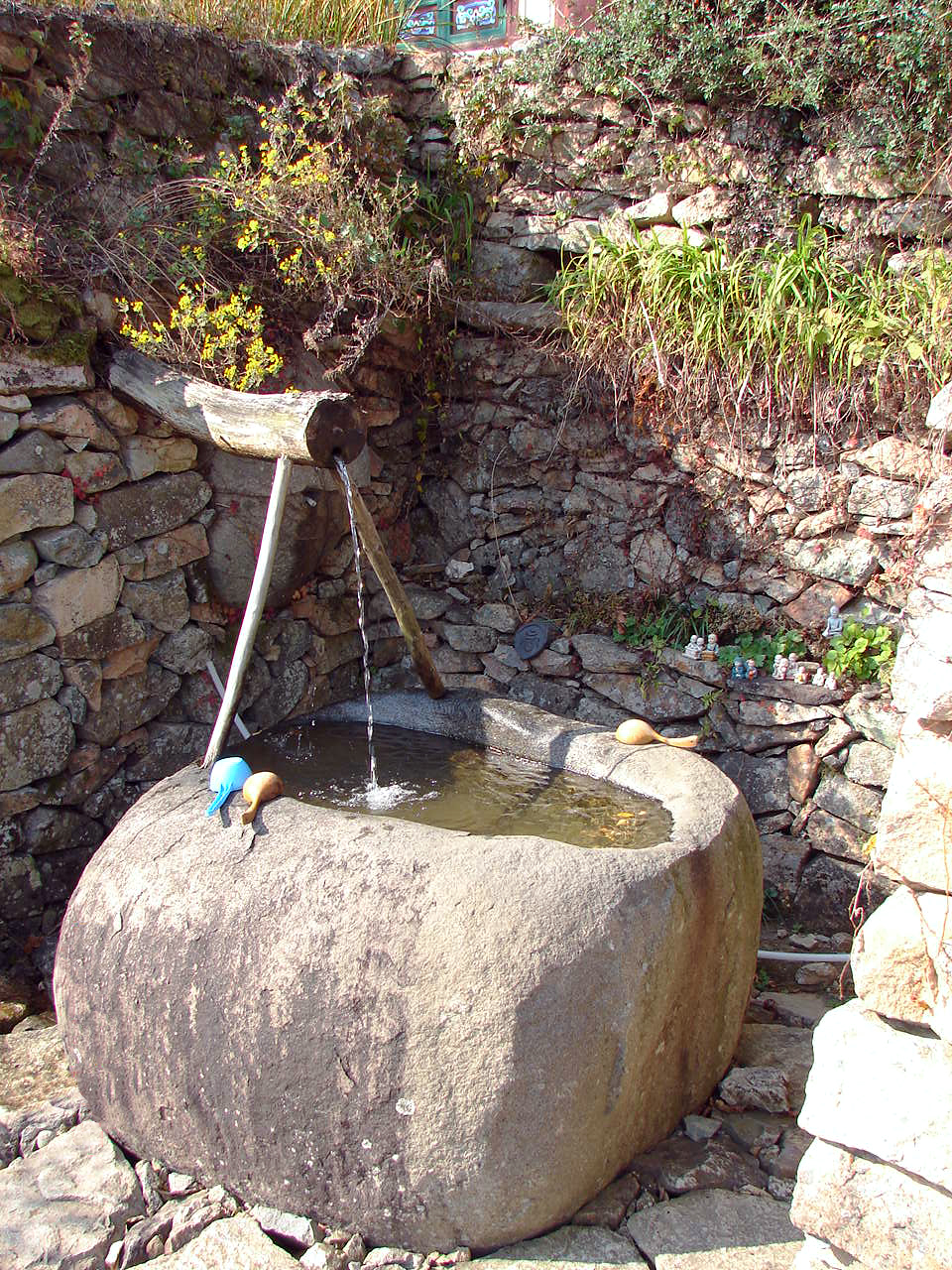
