= Baengnyulsa =

Korean Buddhist temple located on the slopes of Geumgang Mountain

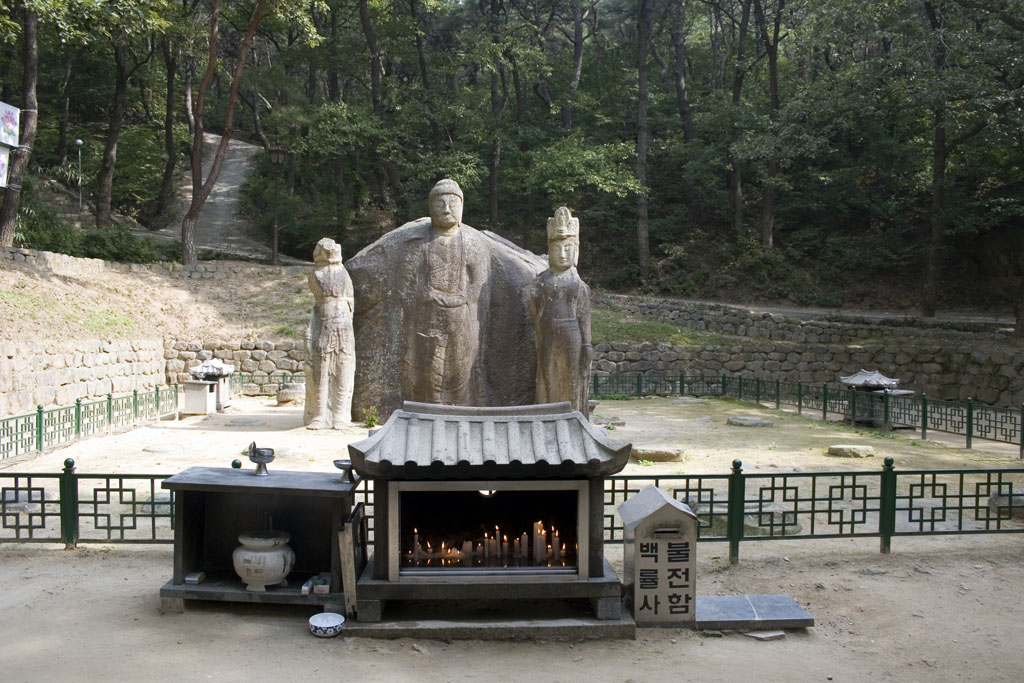
- Four sided stone image of Buddha near the Baengnyulsa temple

Korean name
- Hangul: 백률사
- Hanja: 栢栗寺
- RR: Baengnyulsa
- MR: Paengnyulsa

The Baengnyulsa or Baengnyul temple is a Korean Buddhist temple located on the slopes of Geumgang Mountain in the neighborhood of Dongcheon-dong, Gyeongju, North Gyeongsang province, South Korea. It is a branch temple of Bulguksa temple, the head temple of the 11th district of the Jogye Order. The foundation date is unknown but is speculated to be around the time when the Silla Kingdom united the Three Kingdoms of Korea in 692 according to both an oral story and a document on a Buddha statue. Baengnyulsa is also believed to be the Jachusa temple which is associated with Ichadon's martyrdom.

== Foundation ==
The statue which is not handed down today was said to be created by a Chinese artisan and the temple was created by the time. It is called Daebi Gwaneumsang (大悲觀音像), literally meaning "a statue of the greatly sympathetic Guan Yin". In Samguk Yusa, the statue had a mysterious episode occurring in 693, the second year of the Silla King Hyoso. However, the statue disappeared during the Imjin War, Japanese invasions of Korea in the end of the 16th century.

On the other hand, the temple is strongly suggested as the Jachusa temple (刺楸寺), where the beheaded head of Ichadon, the first martyr for Buddhism in Korea, was flown to and fallen. The Jachusa temple was established on the site to commemorate him in 528, the following year of his martyrdom and the 15th year of King Beopheung's reign. Its name, Jachusa was said to be changed to Baengnyulsa with the meaning of "pine nut and chestnut temple". In the Silla period, if a sound or meaning of a word was same as another word, Silla people sometimes easily changed names. The sound of Ja in the Jachusa is similar to jat, or pine nut which has the same meaning to baek (栢) while chu (楸) refers to chest nut which meaning is the same as yul (栗).

== See also ==
- Ichadon
- Bulguksa
- Buddhism in Korea
- Korean Buddhist temples
