= Ssanggyesa =

Buddhist temple in South Korea

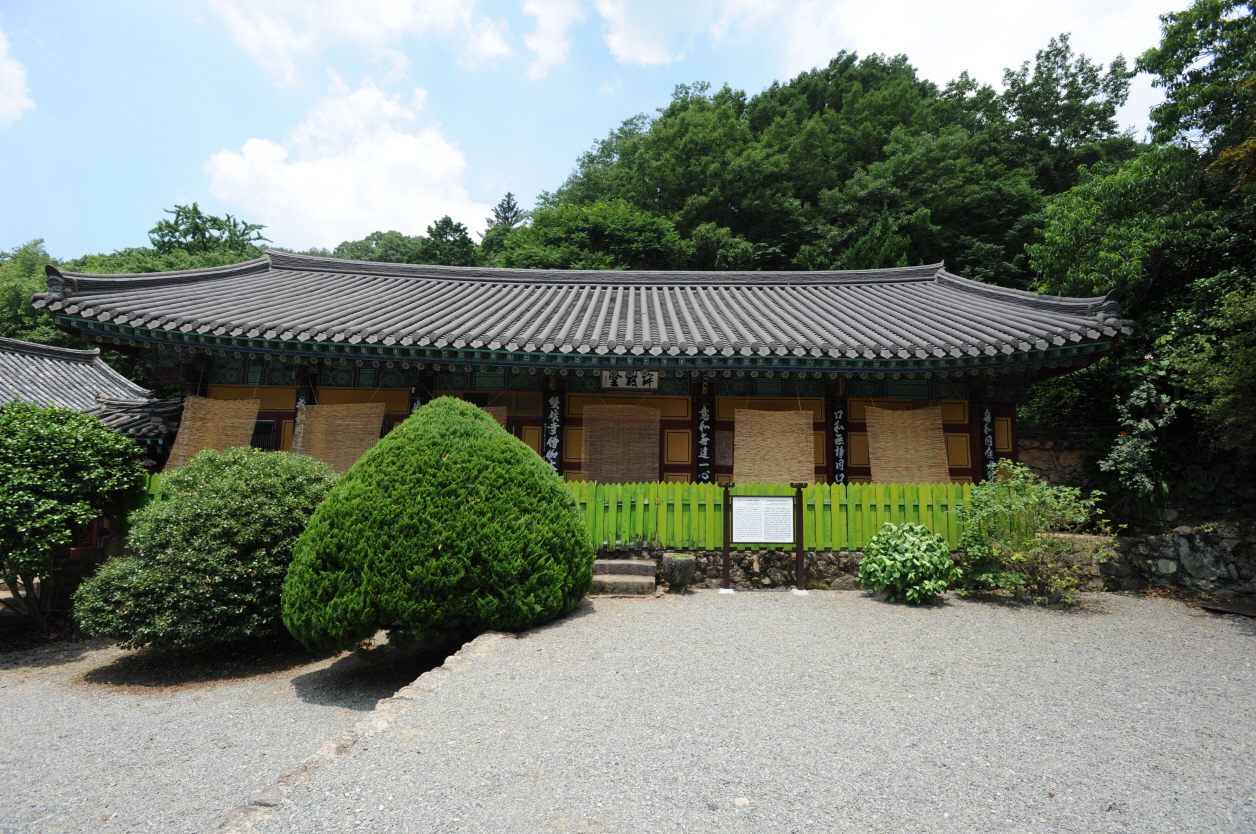

- Location within South Korea

Religion
- Affiliation: Buddhism
- Sect: Jogye Order

Location
- State: Gyeongsangnam-do
- Country: South Korea
- Coordinates: 35°12′N 127°42′E

Architecture
- Completed: 722

Korean name
- Hangul: 쌍계사
- Hanja: 雙磎寺
- RR: Ssanggyesa
- MR: Ssanggyesa

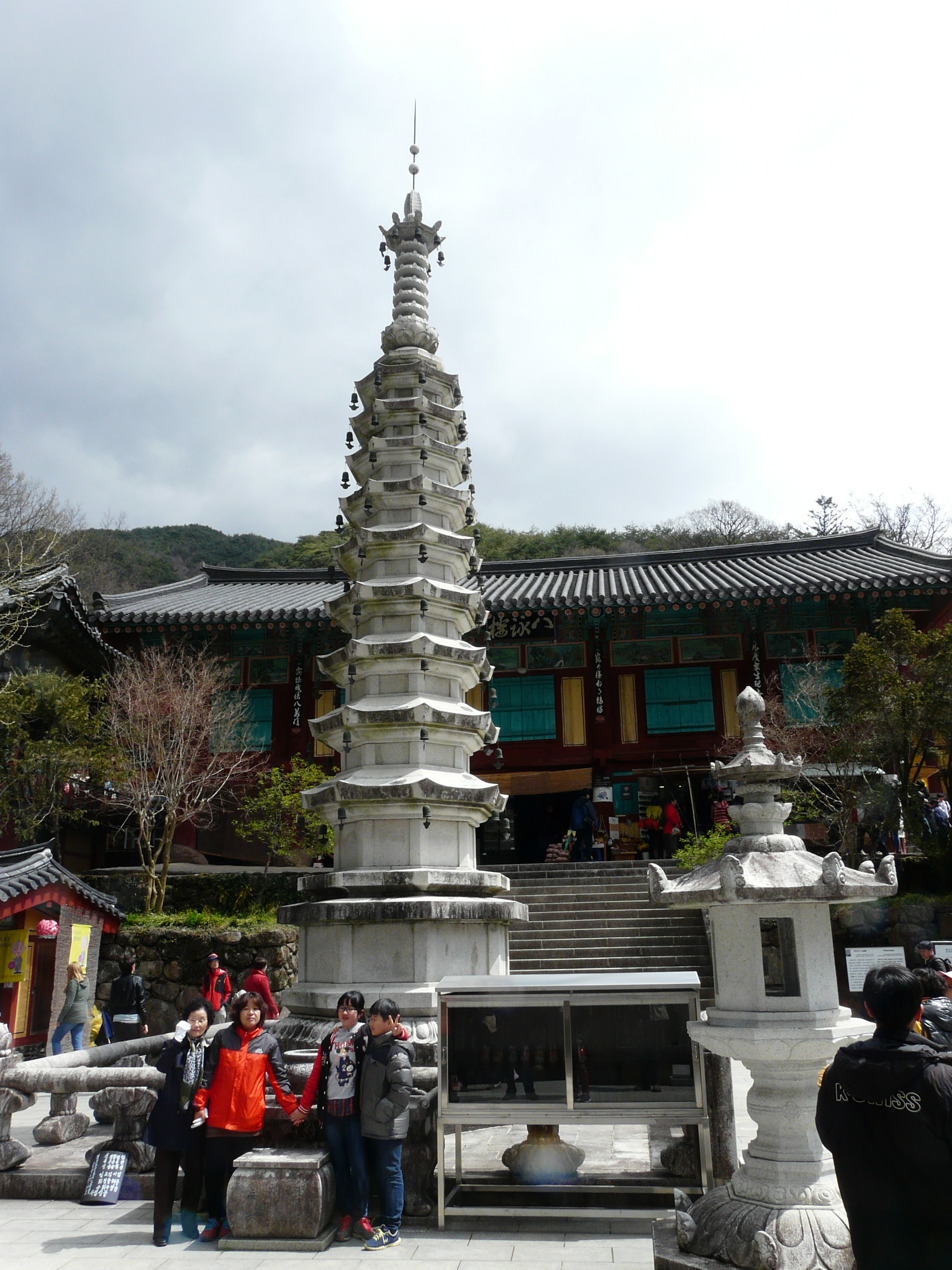
Temple grounds

Ssanggyesa (Korean: 쌍계사) is a head temple of the Jogye Order of Korean Buddhism. It is located on the southern slopes of Jirisan, southwest of sacred Samshin-bong Peak in the Hwagye-dong Valley of Hwagae-myeon, Hadong County, in the province of Gyeongsangnam-do, South Korea.

The temple was founded in 722 by two disciples of Uisang named Sambeop and Daebi. It is said that they were guided to the location by a Jiri-sanshin in the form of a tiger after being instructed by him in dreams to look for a site where arrowroot flowers blossomed through the snow. They had travelled to China for study and returned with the skull and a portrait of "Yukcho" (Hui-neng, the Sixth Patriarch of Seon [Zen] Buddhism), which they respectively buried under the Main Hall and enshrined in it (the skull was later dug up and enshrined in a stone pagoda, which is still there).

In the 9th century, the temple was renamed "Ssanggyesa" (Twin-Streams Monastery) by Jingam (Meditation Master Jingam seonsa, 774–850). He is also credited with creating Beompae (Korean-style Buddhist music & dance) after studying Chinese Buddhist music in Tang Dynasty China. He composed "Eosan" [Fish Mountain] with paleumryul [eight tones and rhythms] while watching fish swim in the nearby Seomjin River, and therefore, the spacious lecture pavilion still dedicated to Beompae performance and education at the front of Ssanggyesa is named Palyeong-ru. A stele dedicated to Jingam seonsa and written by Ch'oe Ch'i-wŏn still stands in the temple, designated the Republic of Korea National Treasure 47.

Most of the rest of the temple dates to the 17th century or later because all its buildings were burned to the ground by Japanese invaders during the Seven Year War.

== See also ==
- Korean Buddhist temples
- Korean Buddhism
- Religion in South Korea
