= Gwaneumsa (Jeju City) =

Buddhist temple in Jeju City, South Korea

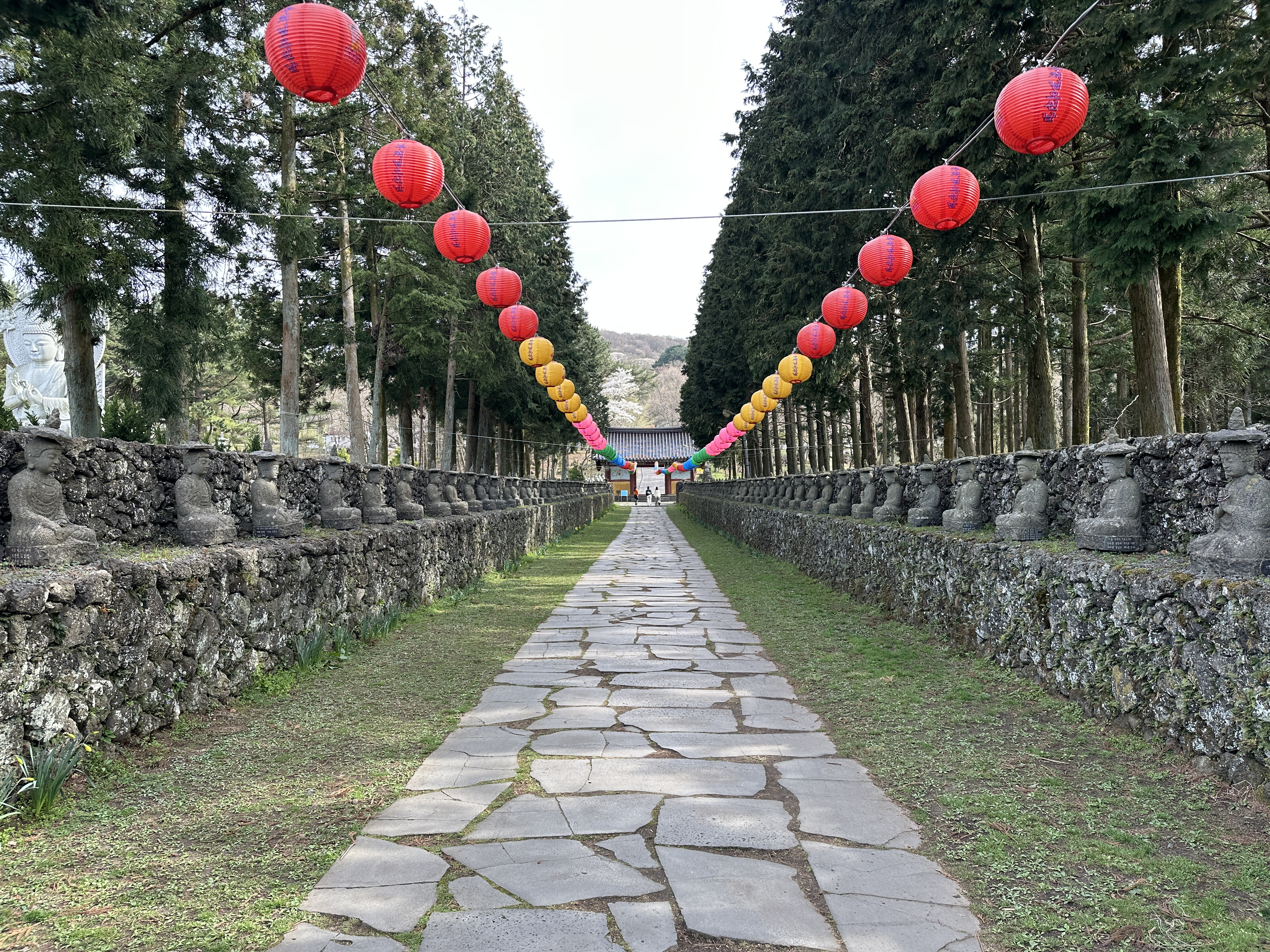
- Entrance to the temple (2026)

Religion
- Affiliation: Korean Buddhism
- Sect: Jogye Order

Location
- Location: Jeju City, South Korea
- Interactive map of Gwaneumsa
- Coordinates: 33.4233°N 126.5587°E

Architecture
- Established: Unknown, reestablished 1909

Website
- www.jejugwaneumsa.or.kr

Gwaneumsa (Korean: 관음사) is a Buddhist temple in Jeju City, Jeju Province, South Korea. It is on the north slopes of the mountain Hallasan.

The temple is located 650m above sea level. It famously has two caves that are used for religious purposes. The cave Haewolgul (해월굴) is located near the front of the temple. Gwaneumgul (관음굴) is located near the rear.

It is not known when the temple was originally established; it is attested to during the Joseon period. It fell into ruin during the reign of King Sukjong, after that king ordered it be closed. The temple was reestablished in 1909 by the monk Pongnyŏgwan (봉려관; 蓬廬觀). During the Jeju uprising in the late 1940s, the temple was seen as a strategically valuable location. Rebels and government forces engaged in a fierce conflict over the area. Locals hid in the temple and its caves for safety during the fighting. During the process, the temple was completely burned down in January 1949. Beginning in 1969, the temple began to be gradually rebuilt. The temple now serves as the head temple of the region.

== Gallery ==
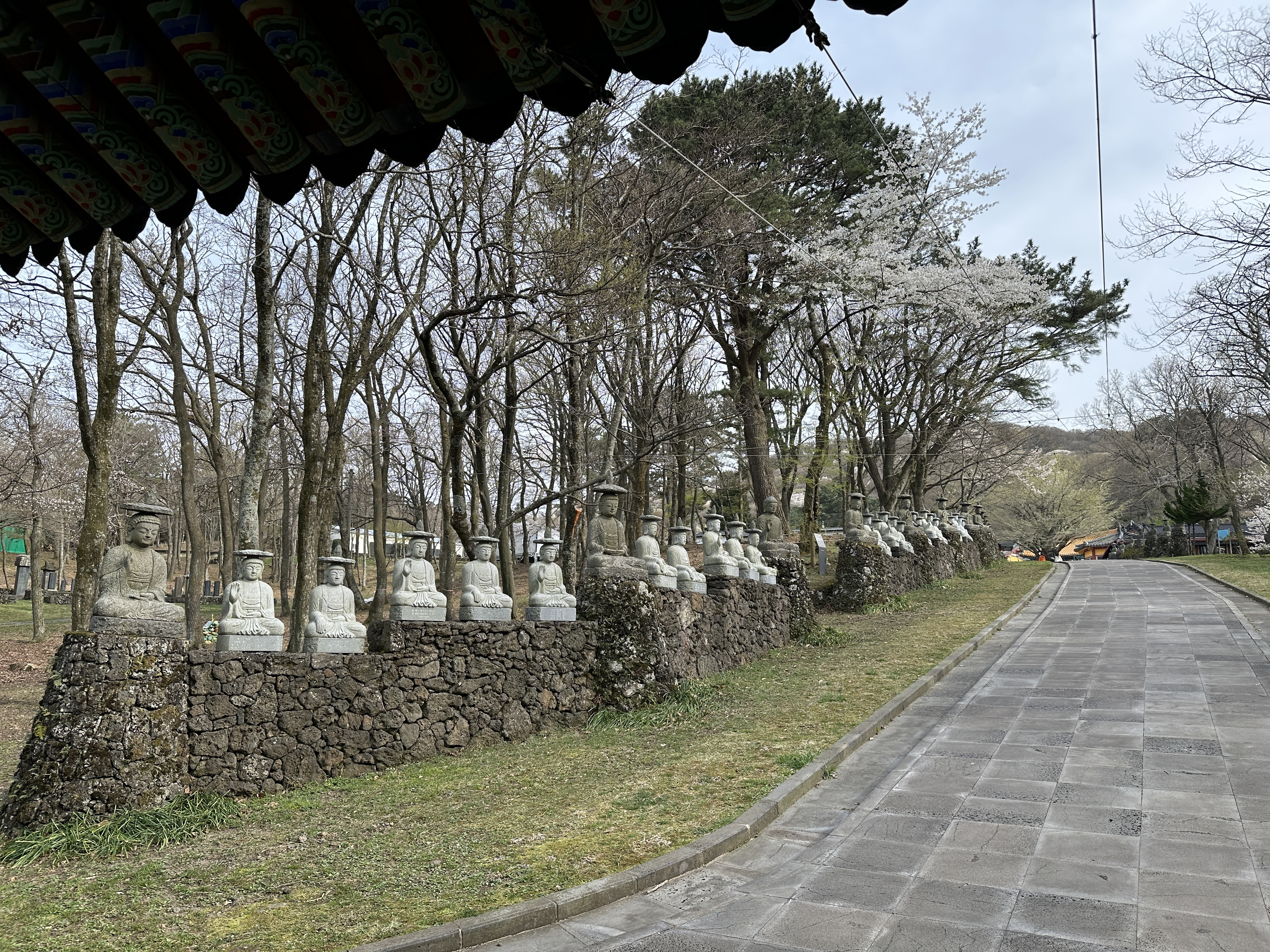
Buddhist statues lining the entrance (2026)

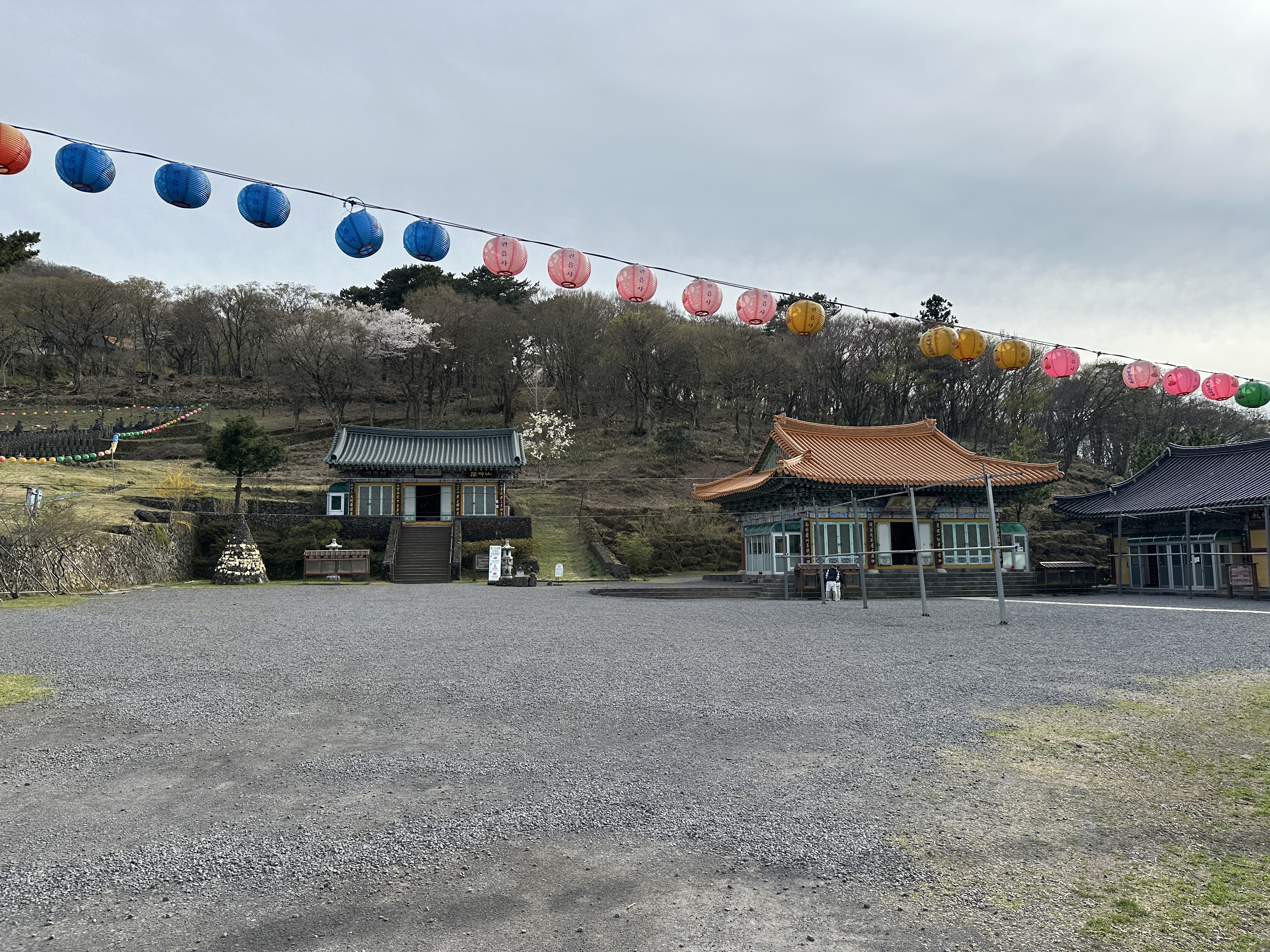
Main plaza (2026)

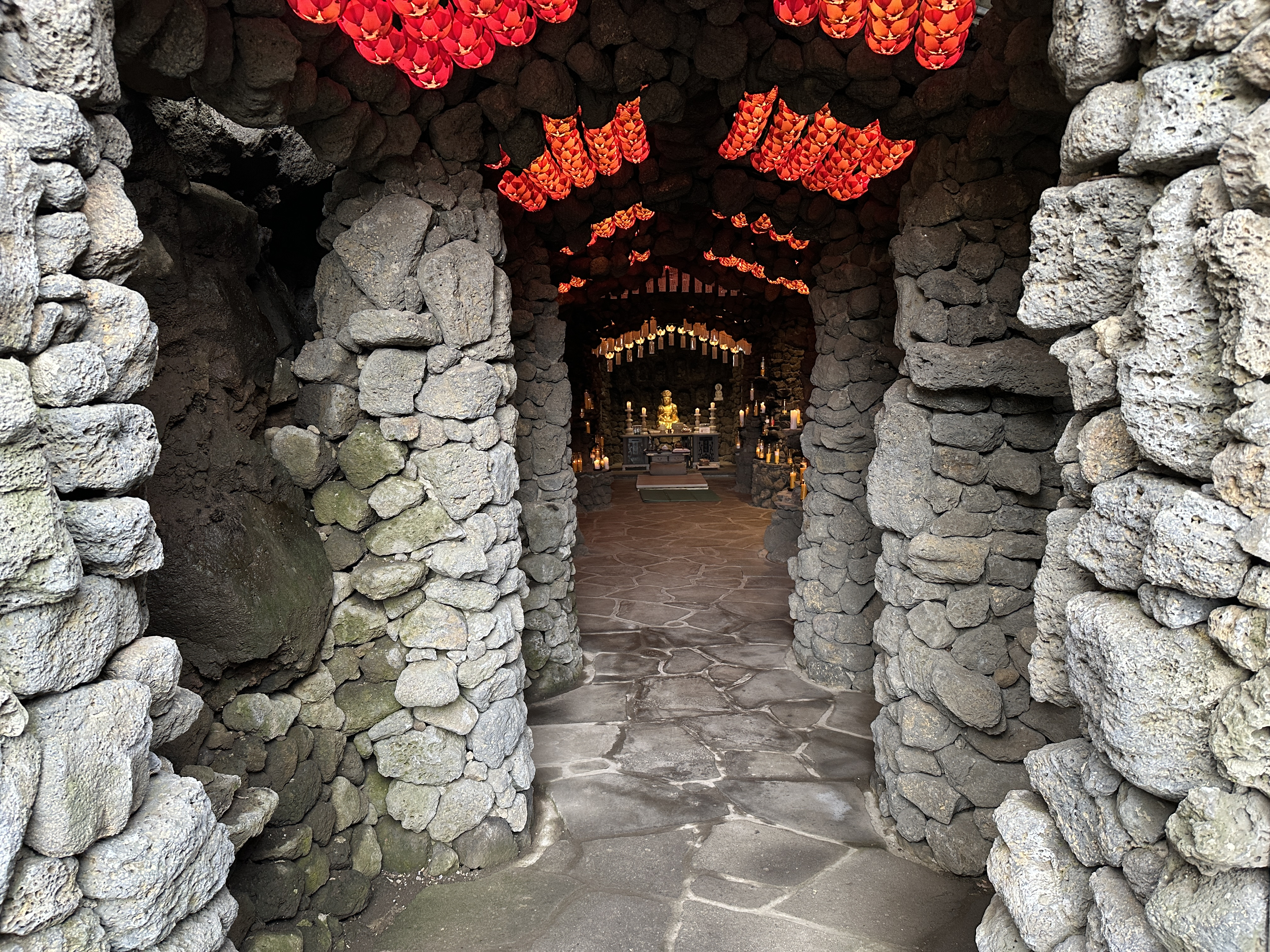
Interior of Gwaneumgul (2026)

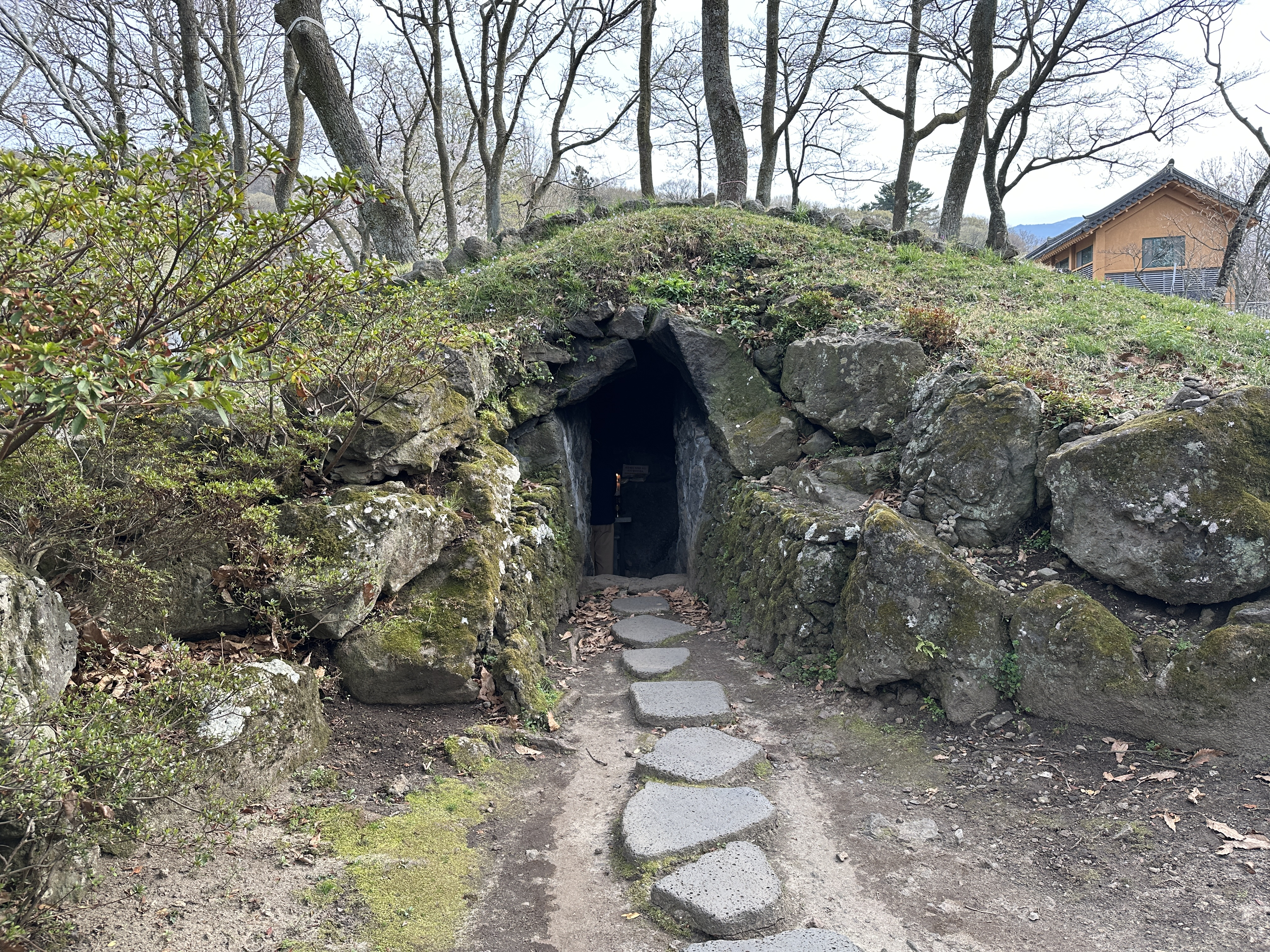
Entrance to Haewolgul (2026)
