= Bulgyo Sinmun =

South Korean Buddhist newspaper

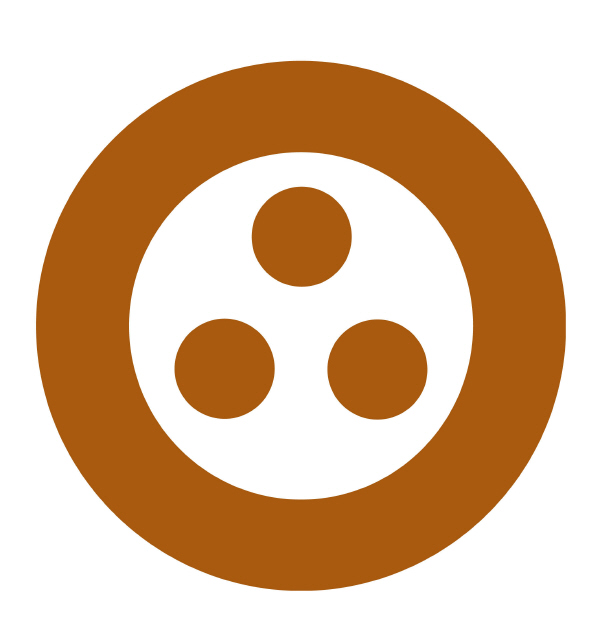
- Owner: Jogye Order
- Editor: Ven. Wonheo
- Founded: January 1, 1960
- Language: Korean
- Website: https://www.ibulgyo.com/

Bulgyo Sinmun (Korean: 불교신문) is a South Korean Buddhist newspaper. It was founded on January 1, 1960 by the Jogye Order under the name Daehan Bulgyo (대한불교). Its first editor was Ven. Cheongdam and the current editor as of 2026 is Ven. Wonheo.

== History ==
Jogye Order founded Daehan Bulgyo on January 1, 1960 after realizing the importance of missionary work through documents. It was forcibly shut down by the government in 1980 in part because of the October 27th Buddhist Persecution. When it was revived on December 21 in the same year, it changed its name to Bulgyo Sinmun. It is credited with reducing the publishing period of Buddhist newspapers from monthly to weekly. It was published twice a week from 2003 but changed to publishing once a week from 2021.

== Awards ==
It hosts an annual spring literary contest.
