= Jogye Order =

Korean Buddhist order

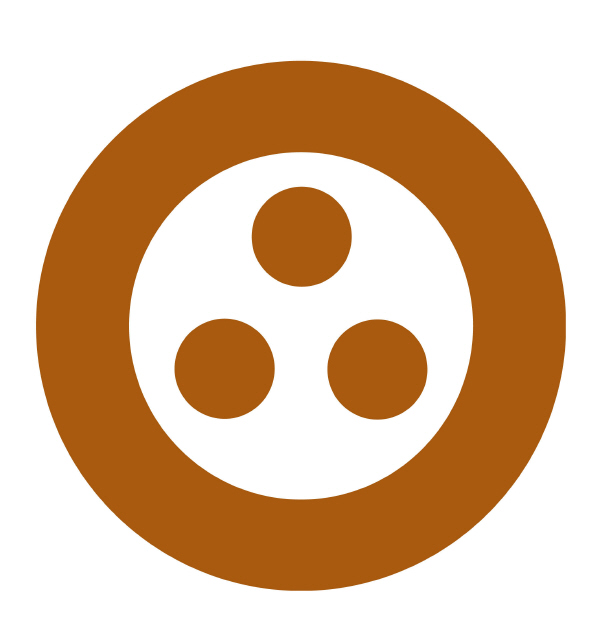
- Classification: Buddhism
- Scripture: Diamond Sutra
- Supreme patriarch: Ven. Seongpa (2022-2027)
- President: Ven. Jinu (2022-2026)
- Region: South Korea
- Language: Korean
- Headquarters: 55 Ujeongguk-ro, Jongno District, Seoul
- Founder: Doui

The Jogye Order (Korean: 조계종), officially the Jogye Order of Korean Buddhism (대한불교조계종), is a sect of Korean Buddhism. It is the largest Buddhist sect in South Korea as of 2018. It has its roots in the nine mountain schools of Unified Silla and developed under Jinul during the Goryeo dynasty. Despite suppression during the Joseon dynasty and Japanese colonial period, it survived and its modern form was established in 1962.

The order's principal scripture is the Diamond Sutra and its followers practice ganhwaseon meditation, while it also accepts other Buddhist practices. Today, it operates 25 parishes and promotes Korean Buddhism globally through programs such as Templestay. However, it has faced controversies involving misconduct of some monks.

== History ==
The order takes its name from Mount Caoxi where Huineng, the sixth patriarch of Chan Buddhism resided. It has its roots in the nine mountain schools established in Unified Silla. Its founder (종조) is thought to be Doui who first brought Seon (Zen) to Korea. Jinul is thought to be the Prospering Patriach (중천조) and Bou is thought to be the Reviving Patriarch (중흥조).

=== Goryeo ===
The nine mountain schools were reorganized into the Jogye Order and began to prosper under the leadership of Jinul. Jinul promoted the principle of donojeomsu (sudden enlightenment followed by gradual cultivation), emphasizing meditation as well as studying the Sutra. The order gained support from the Goryeo military regime due to its emphasis on continuous discipline and became a unique and indigenous Buddhist practice.

=== Joseon ===
Joseon implemented policies that promoted Confucianism and suppressed Buddhism for centuries such as banning monks from entering the capital. During the reign of Prince Yeonsan, Jogye Order faced persecution. Nevertheless, Buddhism was preserved in sansa through the efforts of eminent monks such as Hyujeong and Yujeong during the Imjin War. Monks were permitted to enter the capital after the 1895 Kabo Reform.

=== Japanese colonial period ===
Buddhists tried to rebuild Buddhist sects and expand Buddhism into cities through the establishment of Won Order and Imje Order, but these attempts were suppressed by Japanese colonial authorities. In response, eminent monks such as Jinjong and Manhae resisted Japanese rule and the movement to establish an independent Buddhist order continued such as the founding of Seonhakwon in 1921. The movement to establish a principal temple (총본산) was launched in 1937 and the daeungjeon of Taegosa (present-day Jogyesa) was constructed in 1938. However, the Japanese colonial authorities supported the movement, which led to the order later cooperating with Japan's militarism. In 1941, the Jogye Order of Joseon Buddhism (조선불교조계종), the predecessor of Jogye Order, was established.

=== 20th century after liberation ===
After the liberation of Korea, the Buddhism purification movement took place from 1954 to 1962 to restore Korean Buddhist traditions and root out daecheoseung (married monks) who appeared during the colonial period when the Japanese forced Buddhist monks to marry. In 1955, the Jogye Order centered on bhikkus (unmarried monks) was established. Through mediation by eminent monks and the government, daecheoseung were tolerated and in 1962, the Jogye Order of Korean Buddhism was officially established. However, in 1970, daecheoseung created a separate Buddhist Order (Taego Order).

During the October 27th Buddhist Persecution in 1980, the Chun Doo-hwan government arrested and investigated monks and personnel of the Jogye Order in order to "purify the Buddhist community". 153 people were arrested and investigated on October 27 and another 1,776 people were arrested three days later. The real reason of the incident is thought to be that the headquarter of the order had visited Gwangju to support the victims of the Gwangju Uprising and launched its own purification campaign. It is considered an abuse of state power under martial law and violation of religious freedom.

In 1994, Ven. Uihyeon, the president at that time, attempted to secure a third consecutive term although the constitution of the order (종헌) did not clearly state whether the president could be elected three times. Consequently, young monks formed the Pan-Sangha Order Reform Promotion Committee (범승가종단개혁추진회) in 1994 and launched efforts to block his reappointment and reform the order. When it was later revealed that the headquarters hired thugs to enforce the election, the incident became a nationwide issue. The committee later established a reform council and rooted out corrupt monks.

=== 21st century ===
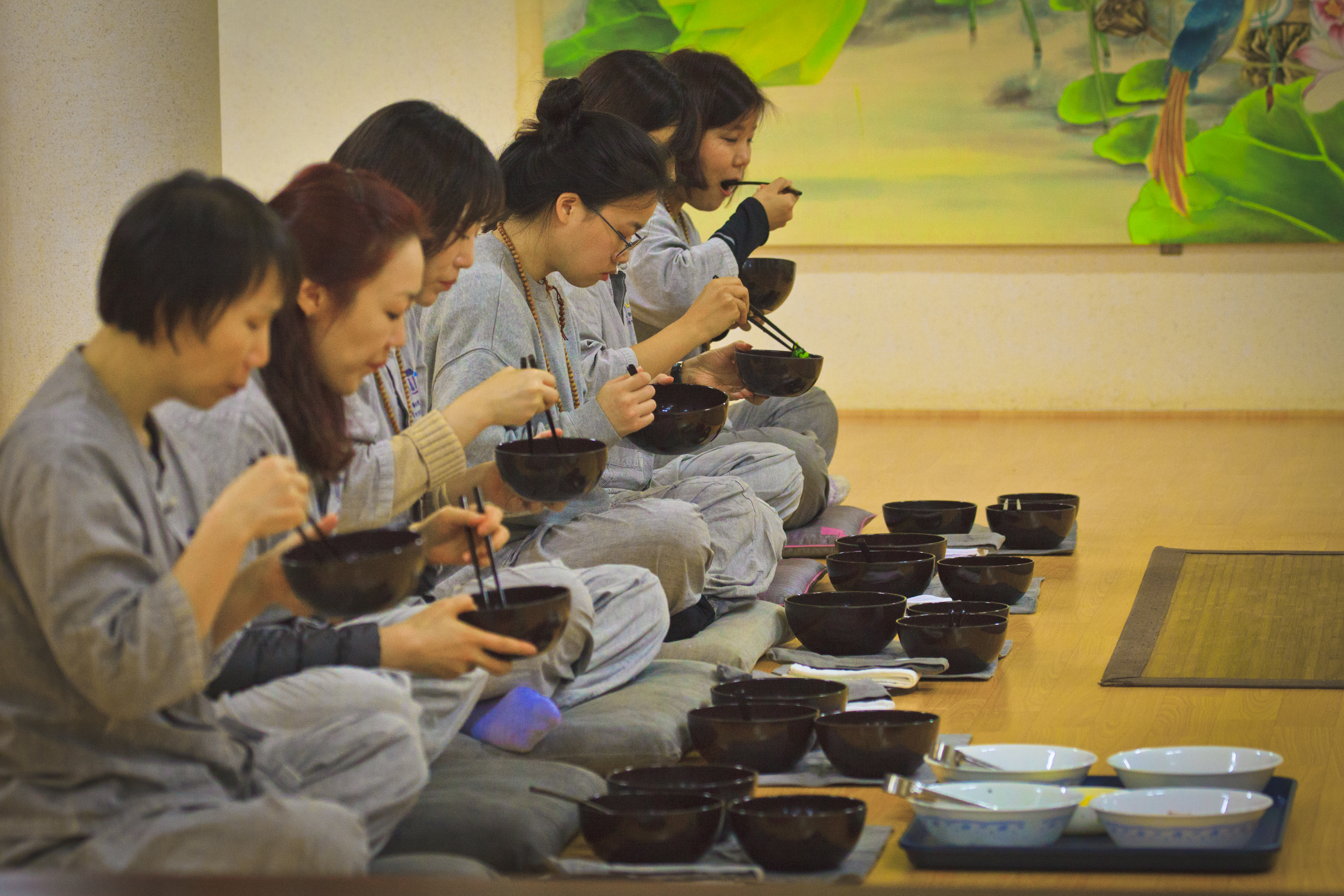
Participants of Templestay

To globalize Korean Buddhism, the order founded the Cultural Corps of Korean Buddhism (한국불교문화사업단) in 2004 and launched various programs such as Templestay, promotion of Korean temple cuisine, and training of foreign monks. In the 2000s, the order helped restore Singyesa in North Korea.

In a 2018 survey, the Association of Korean Buddhist Orders reported that the order has 3,185 temples, 13,327 monks, and 12 million followers, making it the largest Buddhist sect in South Korea. However, as of 2017, the order has 260,000 registered followers. As of 2026, the supreme patriarch (종정) is Ven. Seongpa and the president (총무원장) is Ven. Jinu.

== Religious characteristics ==
The core principles (종지) of the order are direct pointing to the mind (직지인심; 直指人心), seeing one's true nature and attaining Buddhahood (견성성불; 見性成佛) and transmitting Dharma and saving sentient beings (전법도생; 傳法度生). The principal scriptures of the Jogye Order are the Diamond Sutra and Dharma Words of the Transmission of the Lamp (전등법어; 傳燈法語) and its principle practice method is ganhwaseon where a master presents a hwadu (koan) to a disciple and guides his or her inquiry into it. Meanwhile, the order acknowledges the tradition of syncretic Buddhism (통불교) that incorporates Huayan, Pure Land Buddhism, and Vajrayana and thus does not restrict the study of other scriptures and practices such as nianfo and chants.

== Composition and operation ==
The Jogye Order is made up of headquarters (총무원) which functions as the executive branch, central council (중앙종회) which functions as the legislative branch, and precepts adjudication council (호계원) which functions as the judicial branch. The supreme patriarch, who holds the highest status and authority within the order, is appointed and serves a 5-year term. The president, who represents the order and oversees administrative affairs, is elected through an indirect election system by a 321-member electoral body. The abbot (주지) of a head temple represents the temple and is appointed by the president after being elected. As Jogyesa is a head temple directly administered by the headquarters, the president serves as its abbot.

=== Head temples ===
Jogye Order has 25 parishes (교구). (Note: Other sources state that the order has 24 parishes.) Jogyesa is the principal temple. The head temple of a parish is called bonsa (본사; 本寺) and oversees parish affairs. Its subordinate temples are called malsa (말사; 末寺) and one parish has ten to hundreds of malsa. The prototype of the 25-parish system is the 31-bonsan system implemented during the Japanese colonial period.

- Parish 1: Jogyesa (Jongno, Seoul)
- Parish 2: Yongjusa (Hwaseong, Gyeonggi)
- Parish 3: Sinheungsa (Sokcho, Gangwon)
- Parish 4: Woljeongsa (Pyeongchang, Gangwon)
- Parish 5: Beopjusa (Boeun, North Chungcheong)
- Parish 6: Magoksa (Gongju, South Chungcheong)
- Parish 7: Sudeoksa (Yesan, South Chungcheong)
- Parish 8: Jikjisa (Gimcheon, North Gyeongsang)
- Parish 9: Donghwasa (Dong District, Daegu)
- Parish 10: Eunhaesa (Yeongcheon, North Gyeongsang)
- Parish 11: Bulguksa (Gyeongju, North Gyeongsang)
- Parish 12: Haeinsa (Hapcheon, South Gyeongsang)
- Parish 13: Ssanggyesa (Hadong, South Gyeongsang)
- Parish 14: Beomeosa (Geumjeong, Busan)
- Parish 15: Tongdosa (Yangsan, South Gyeongsang)
- Parish 16: Gounsa (Uiseong, North Gyeongsang)
- Parish 17: Geumsansa (Gimje, North Jeolla)
- Parish 18: Baegyangsa (Jangseong, South Jeolla)
- Parish 19: Hwaeomsa (Gurye, South Jeolla)
- Parish 20: Seonamsa (Suncheon, South Jeolla)
- Parish 21: Songgwangsa (Suncheon, South Jeolla)
- Parish 22: Daeheungsa (Haenam, South Jeolla)
- Parish 23: Gwaneumsa (Jeju City, Jeju Province)
- Parish 24: Seonunsa (Gochang, North Jeolla)
- Parish 25: Bongseonsa (Namyangju, Gyeonggi)

There was a dispute between Jogye Order and Taego Order over the ownership of Seonamsa and a 2022 court ruling recognized the ownership of the latter.

== Philanthropy ==
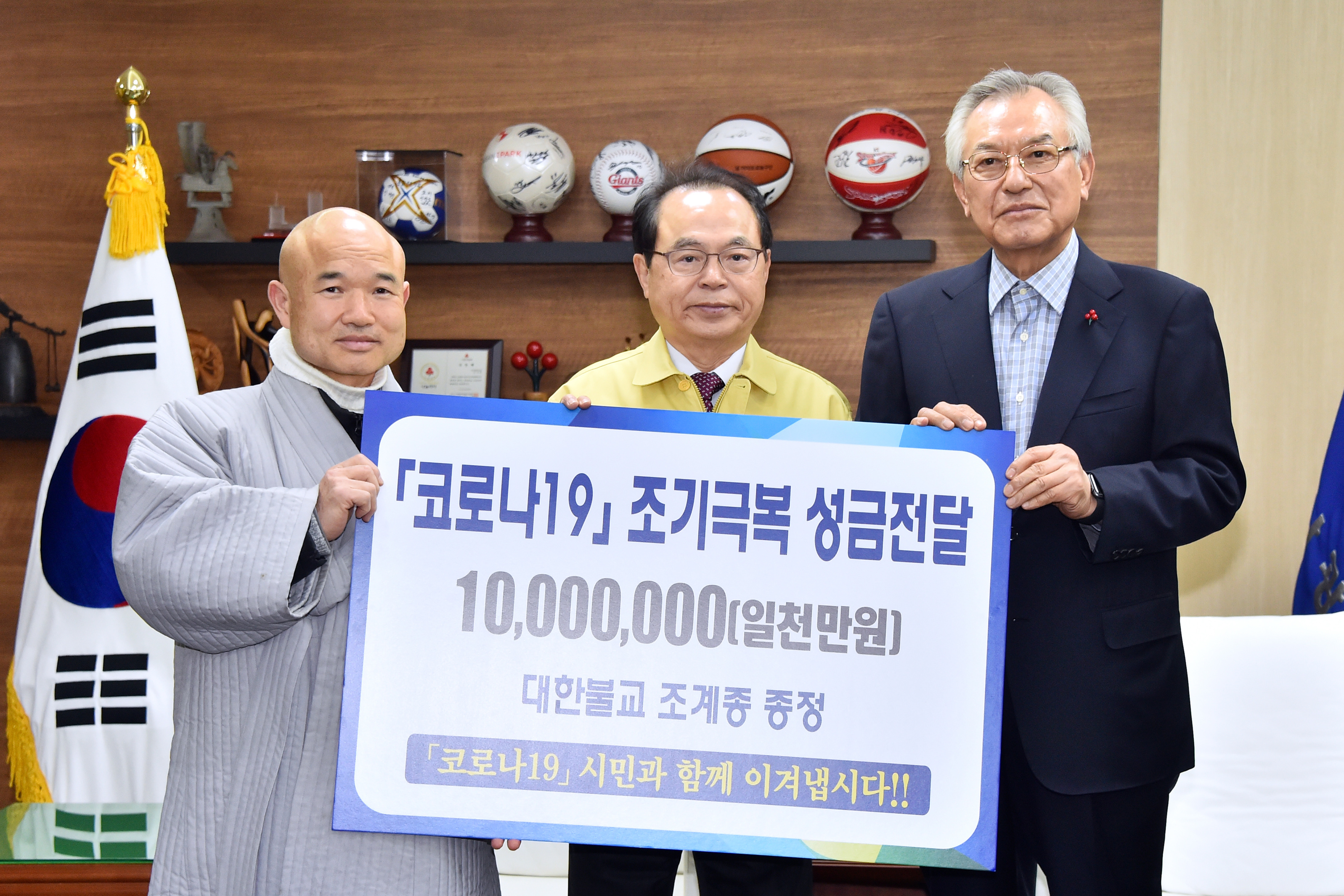
In 2020, the order donated for the overcoming of COVID-19 pandemic.

The Jogye Order Social Welfare Foundation, established in 1995, operates facilities for the disabled, elderly, and homeless. It also has provided disaster relief to victims of the 2005 Sri Lanka earthquake, 2011 Tōhoku earthquake and tsunami and 2014 Sinking of MV Sewol. In 2020, the order donated for the overcoming of COVID-19 pandemic.

== Major controversies ==
During the 1998 president election, tensions escalated over Ven. Wolju’s bid for a third term, leading to violent clashes within the order. The situation was eventually brought to an end by the police charging 28 people. In later president elections, vote buying and black propaganda became a problem due to indirect election, prompting some to suggest alternative voting methods.

In 2012, footage of monks gambling and drinking was revealed, resulting in the entire executive board of headquarters resigning. In 2018, Ven. Seoljeong was accused of falsifying his academic credentials and having a hidden wife and child, resulting in him stepping down from president. Some researchers argued that these scandals may have led to the decreased number of postulants.

== Affiliated organizations ==
=== Bulgyo Sinmun ===
Jogye Order founded the Buddhist newspaper Daehan Bulgyo on January 1, 1960 after realizing the importance of missionary work through documents. It was forcibly shut down by the government in 1980 in part because of the October 27th Buddhist Persecution. When it was revived on December 21 in the same year, it changed its name to Bulgyo Sinmun.

=== Central Buddhist Museum ===
The order established the Central Buddhist Museum in 2007 to preserve Buddhist cultural properties difficult for individual temples to house and care for and to promote Buddhist culture. One of its important collections is Reliquaries from the Three-story Stone Pagoda of Bulguksa Temple designated as National Treasure.

=== Schools ===
As of 2003, the order operates 24 schools.

- Dongguk University
- Joongang Sangha University: Private university established in 1979 to teach and research Buddhism
- Neungin High School

== See also ==
- Korean Seon
- Taego Order
