= October 27th Buddhist Persecution =

Persecution of Buddhists of the Jogye Order in 1980

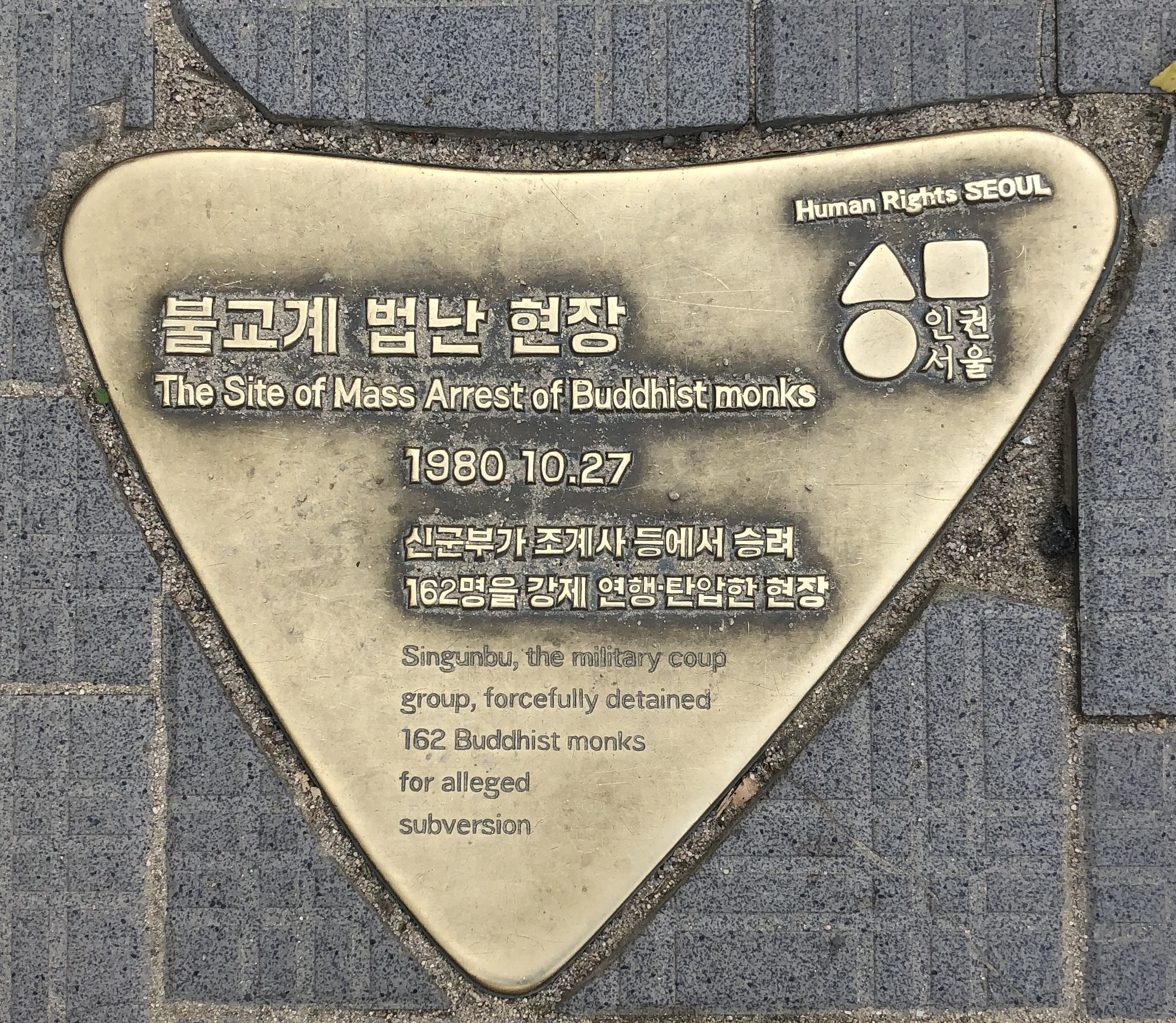
- Sign on the incident at Jogyesa
- Date: October 27, 1980
- Location: South Korea

Lead figures
Chun Doo-hwan government	Ven. Wolju

Casualties
- Arrested: 1,929

The October 27th Buddhist Persecution (Korean: 10·27 법난) is an incident in 1980 when the Chun Doo-hwan government arrested and investigated people related to the Jogye Order. 153 people were arrested and investigated on October 27 and another 1,776 people were arrested three days later. It is considered an abuse of state power under martial law and violation of religious freedom.

In 2008, the Act on the Restoration of Honor of Victims of the October 27th Buddhist Persecution Incident was enacted.

== Background ==
The Emergency Committee for National Protection promoted the "three stage social purification plan" in June 1980 and planned the purge of the religious community from October. From September, it collected information on corruption of the Jogye Order and ordered an investigation. Internal reports referred to the head monks of major temples as “thugs".

Although the government claimed that the Buddhist community being corrupt and incapable of self-purification was the reason of the incident, the real reason is thought to be that the headquarter of the Jogye Order had visited Gwangju to support the victims of the Gwangju Uprising. Also, Ven. Wolju, the president of the Jogye Order, refused to support Chun due to separation of religion and state.

== Incident and aftermath ==
On October 27, 1980, the Martial Law Headquarters arrested 153 Buddhist figures including Ven. Wolju. Of the 153 people, 18 were criminally charged, 3 were sent to Samchung re-education camp, 24 were confined at Heungguksa, 32 were disciplined by the Buddhist Purification Revival Council (불교정화중흥회), and 60 were found not guilty.

On October 30, 30,000 armed soldiers and police officers were mobilized to search 5,700 temples and hermitages across the country and 1,776 additional people were arrested. Of the 1,776 people, 16 were criminally charged, 1 was sent to Samchung re-education camp, and 40 were disciplined by the Buddhist Purification Revival Council with 9 expelled, 11 defrocked, 16 qualification suspended, and 4 reprimanded.

The victims were detained at Seobinggo Detention Center or local security forces and questioned for 20 days. Detectives demanded that they “confess their corruption or crime honestly" and those who denied the accusations were beaten or tortured. Torture methods included beatings, water torture, electric shock and sleep deprivation. Also, Ven. Wolju was forced to resign although the four people who sent anonymous letters accusing him of corruption were later punished for false accusation.

According to a 2012 study, the victims continue to suffer from health problems and PTSD from the torture and mistreatment they endured. They also paid medical expenses due to injuries caused by torture and beatings. Furthermore, distorted media coverage on the incident led to a decline in the number of followers, making temple operation difficult. The incident has been described by the Buddhist community as the most disgraceful incident in Korean Buddhism after the liberation of Korea.

== Investigation and reparation ==
The Buddhist community continuously sought for the truth and the restoration of honor for the victims. In November 1980, the Korean University Student Buddhist Association (한국대학생불교연합회) issued the first public statement defining the incident as a Buddhist persecution and demanding an official government apology. In 1984, the Jogye Order amended its constitution to grant amnesty to monks who had been forcibly stripped of their monastic status during the persecution and held a rally condemning the incident and demanding an investigation. As a result, in 1988, Prime Minister Kang Young-hoon issued an official government apology.

In 2005, Buddhist groups formed the October 27th Buddhist Persecution Countermeasures Committee (10.27 불교법난대책위원회). In 2007, the Ministry of National Defense established a truth commission and investigated the incident. Based on the findings, the Act on the Restoration of Honor of Victims of the October 27th Buddhist Persecution Incident (10ㆍ27법난 피해자의 명예회복 등에 관한 법률) was enacted by the National Assembly in 2008. The law promises to cover the victims' medical expenses and build an educational center on the incident.

The memorial hall on the incident is scheduled to be completed in 2028 on the grounds of Bongeunsa.

== External link ==
- Committee for 10·27 Buddhist Persecution Honor-restoration
