= Sansa (temple) =

Korean Buddhist temples on mountains

- Hangul: 산사
- Hanja: 山寺
- RR: sansa
- MR: sansa

Sansa (Korean: 산사; lit. 'mountain temple') is a term for any Korean Buddhist temple located on a mountain. Seven of these temples are designated as UNESCO World Cultural Heritage Sites. With the country being largely mountainous and Buddhism deeply rooted in its history, there are many sansas across the country.

== Background ==
There are several philosophical reasons why temples in Korea are usually located in mountains. The first reason is mountain worship. As indigenous mountain worship was absorbed into Buddhism, famous mountains were named after Buddha and Bodhisattva and temples were built there. The second reason is to protect the nation and uphold Buddhist law. For example, the establishment of Beomeosa in Busan which is close to Japan can be seen as a strong will to defend the country. The third reason is transcendence. Buddhism was seen as a means of guiding the secular world and harmony with nature was emphasized.

== UNESCO World Heritage sansas ==
Sansa	Location	Established
Tongdosa (통도사; 通度寺)	Yangsan	646
Buseoksa (부석사; 浮石寺)	Yeongju	676
Bongjeongsa (봉정사; 鳳停寺)	Andong	677
Beopjusa (법주사; 法住寺)	Boeun County	Mid 8th Century
Magoksa (마곡사; 麻谷寺)	Gongju	Latter half of the 9th Century
Seonamsa (선암사; 仙巖寺)	Suncheon	Latter half of the 9th Century
Daeheungsa (대흥사; 大興寺)	Haenam County	Latter half of the 9th Century

== See also ==
- Buddhist temples in Korea

== External link ==
- UNESCO page
