= Yongjusa =

Buddhist temple in Hwaseong, South Korea

- 용주사
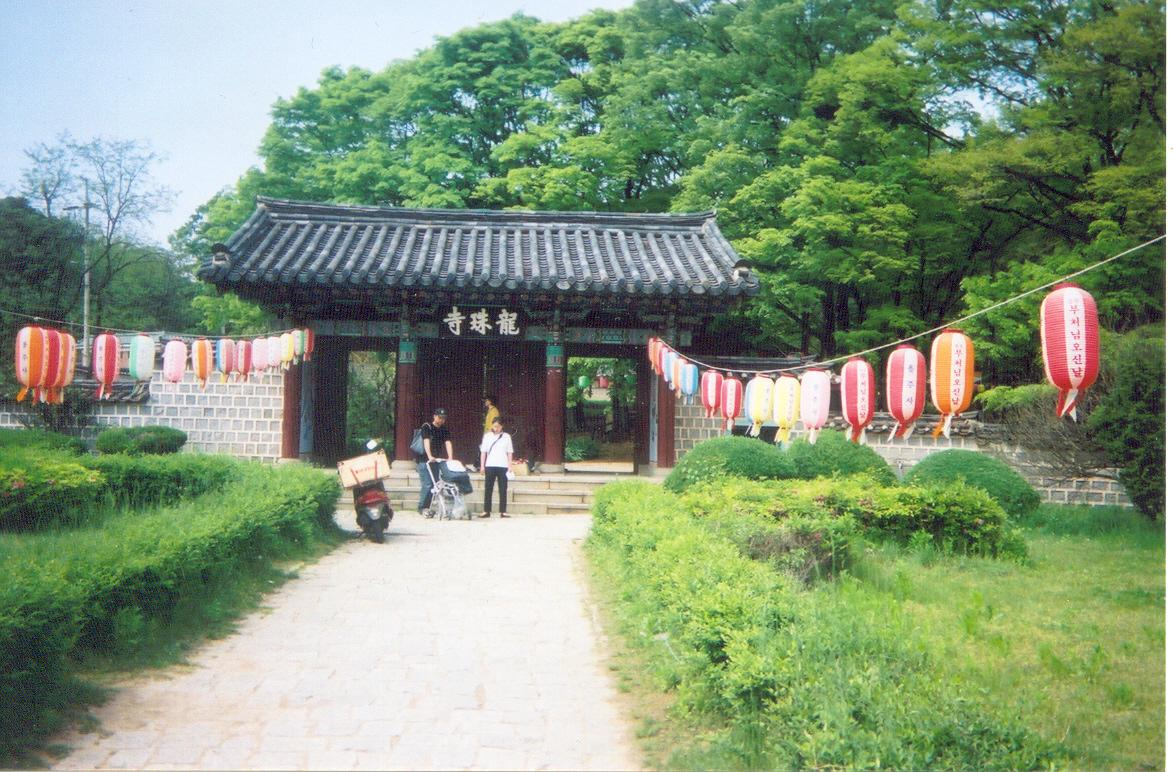

- Location within South Korea

Religion
- Affiliation: Jogye Order of Korean Buddhism

Location
- Location: 136, Yongju-ro, Hwaseong-si, Gyeonggi-do
- Country: South Korea
- Coordinates: 37°12′44″N 127°00′18″E

Yongjusa (Korean: 용주사; Hanja: 龍珠寺; lit. 'Dragon Jewel Temple') is a head temple of the Jogye Order of Korean Buddhism. It is located in on the slopes of Hwasan in Taean-eup, Hwaseong, Gyeonggi Province, South Korea.

Two large bells in the temple are believed to date to the Unified Silla period. One of them, the "Bell of Yongjusa", is designated national treasure 120.

The temple was initially established in 854 AD, under the name Garyangsa. It was expanded in the 10th century. It was rebuilt in the late 18th century under the orders of Jeongjo in honor of his deceased father, Prince Sado. This is one of few cases where the Joseon royal house supported Buddhism directly. At this time the temple changed to its current name.

The temple is located near Seoul Subway Line 1, and is also connected to Suwon by intercity bus.

== History ==
Yongjusa was established in 854 under the name Garyangsa by Yeomgeo Hwasang (廉居和尙), the Second Patriarch of the Gajisan School after National Preceptor Doui Guksa. During the reign of Goryeo's King Gwangjong, it is recorded that National Preceptor Hyegeo Guksa resided here to pray for the welfare of the state. Garyangsa was burnt down during the Manchu invasion of Korea (1636–1637).

The reconstruction of Garyangsa was initiated by the Joseon's 22nd King, Jeongjo. King Jeongjo's father, Prince Sado, was forced to death cruelly by his own father, King Yongjo, after being confined in a wooden rice chest for eight days. Jeongjo thought his father's soul couldn't reach heaven and was wandering in Hades. In the 13th year of his reign, Jeongjo relocated the tomb of his father, Crown Prince Sado, from Mt. Baebongsan in Jeonnong-dong, Seoul, to its current site near Yongjusa. He also undertook the large scale construction projects of building Suwon's Hwaseong Fortress and Hwaseong Haenggung Palace near Yongjusa. The king had to come here frequently to supervise the construction of the tomb and Hwaseong Fortress. To shorten the journey, he built a new road that cut across to Siheung and a stone bridge called Manangyo in Anyang.

At that time there was one monk who greatly touched the heart of King Jeongjo. He was Boil Sail who was originally from Borimsa Temple on Mt. Gajisan. Deeply moved by the content of the Parental Benevolence Sutra taught by Boil, the king rebuilt Garyangsa and renamed it Yongjusa. Afterward, he moved his father's tomb near it and tasked the temple with taking care of it.

== Features and treasures ==
=== Daewoongbojeon ===
Daewoongbojeon was built in 1790 and is the central building that contains a statue of Buddha. Even though it is not such an old building, it kept the scale and pattern of the era in which it was built. It has a "Dapogye" pattern with 3 sections in front and 3 sections on each side and consists of doubled eaves and beautiful pictures of many colors and designs. It represents the features of temple architecture as well as specific characteristics of royal palace architecture.

=== The main platform painting in Daewoongbojeon ===
The main platform painting in Dawoongbojeon is a picture 3 meters in width and 4 meters in length. It was painted by Kim Hongdo, one of the most highly reputed Korean painters who was magistrate of the county at that time. The main platform painting is made up of two stages. On the upper stage, the Buddha statue is located between Yaksabul who relieves all living beings from diseases and pains on the left and Amitabul who will bring all living beings to heaven on the right. On lower stage, ten Buddhist saints, Buddha's disciples and four heavenly guardians of Buddhism are placed. An interesting feature is that everyone in the picture is concentrating their view toward Buddha. It has the round composition of a painting.

=== Bronze bell ===
“A bronze bell has been cast by Seok Banya with 15,000 kg (33,070 lbs) of bronze for Garyangsa Temple on Mt. Seonghwangsan. -In September of the 16th year of King Jeongjo’s reign, Buddhist Monk Yeomgeo”

This is the passage inscribed on Yongjusa's bronze bell. As its year of production is certain and it was preserved in good condition, it was designated National Treasure No. 120. The “Monk’s Stupa of Yeomgeo Hwasang” (Heungbeopsaji-yeomgeohwasang-tap), National Treasure No. 104, is on display in the National Museum of Korea. Its inscription tells us the Buddhist monk Yeomgeo resided at Eokjeongsa on Mt. Seoraksan, Heungbeopsa in Wonju, and at Yongjusa.

=== Kim Hong-do's scroll painting ===
It is not difficult to guess that in the reconstruction of Yongjusa, King Jeongjo must have employed his most cherished painter, Kim Hong-do (金弘道, pen name: Danwon). He painted the scroll painting in Yongjusa's Main Buddha Hall, now designated Tangible Cultural Heritage No. 16 by Gyeonggi-do Province. This scroll painting is the first to incorporate techniques of perspective and shading adopted from Western paintings. In addition, the woodblocks used to print the Illustrated Parental Benevolence Sutra (Treasure No. 1754) are based on the illustrations of Kim Hong-do, and they are widely praised for their beauty.

=== list of treasures ===
- National Treasure No. 120 Beom Jong (Dharma Bell)
- Treasure No. 1754 Printing Woodblocks of Sacred Book on Parental Love
- Natural Monument No. 264 Boxwood Tree
- Gyeonggi Tangible Cultural Property No. 11 Gilt-bronze Incense Burner
- Gyeonggi Tangible Cultural Property No. 12 Bronze Incense Burner
- Gyeonggi Tangible Cultural Property No. 13 Sangryang-moon
- Gyeonggi Tangible Cultural Property No. 14 Jeonjeoksusabon (Handwritten Book of Buddhist song lyrics composed by King Jungjo)
- Gyeonggi Tangible Cultural Property No. 15 Folding Screen
- Gyeonggi Tangible Cultural Property No. 16 Hanging Scroll behind the Buddha in the Main Buddha Hall
- Gyeonggi Tangible Cultural Property No. 212 Five-story Stone Pagoda
- Gyeonggi Tangible Cultural Property No. 214 Wooden Seated Buddhist Triad Statue in the Main Buddha Hall
- Gyeonggi Tangible Cultural Property No. 222 Wooden Gamsil
- Gyeonggi Tangible Cultural Property No. 223 Wooden Ksitigarbha Triad, Ten Underworld Kings and other attendant in the Hall of Ksitigarbha
- Gyeonggi Tangible Cultural Property No. 225 Buddhist Painting of Three Bodhisattvas
- Gyeonggi Tangible Cultural Property No. 226 Jung Jong (Dharma Bell)
- Gyeonggi Tangible Cultural Property No. 237 Buddhist Painting of Inrowang Bodhisattva (Bodhisattva who guide the dead to the Pure Land together with Ksitigarbha Bodhisattva)
- Gyeonggi Tangible Cultural Property No. 269 Yongjusa Jeondapanyang 2 volumes (Record of fields and paddies)
- Gyeonggi Cultural Property No. 35 Daewungbojeon Hall (Main Buddha Hall)
- Gyeonggi Cultural Property No. 36 Cheonboru Pavilion
- Gyeonggi Cultural Property No. 151 Wooden Buddhist Nameplate
- Gyeonggi Cultural Property No. 152 Wooden Sodae (container)
- Gyeonggi Cultural Property No.156 Bronze Earthenware Steamer

== Yongjusa as a religious community center ==
Yongjusa is one of the 31 head temples of Jogye Order of Korean Buddhism and currently has 80 branch temples and Buddhist hermitages distributed in southern Gyeonggi Province, such as at Suwon, Youngin and Anyang. It has almost 7,000 devotee households and many Buddhist masses are held. Many trainees practice asceticism and try to pursue the truth. On the other hand, monks in Yongjusa are introducing the wisdom of Buddha through missionary work. Also, in honor of Jeongjo's filial piety, it established institute for the study of filial conduct and contributes a community center for encouraging humanity.

== Gallery ==
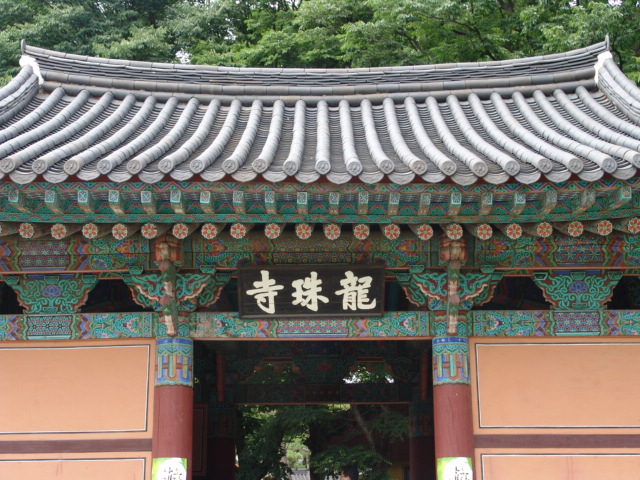
Yongjusa front gate

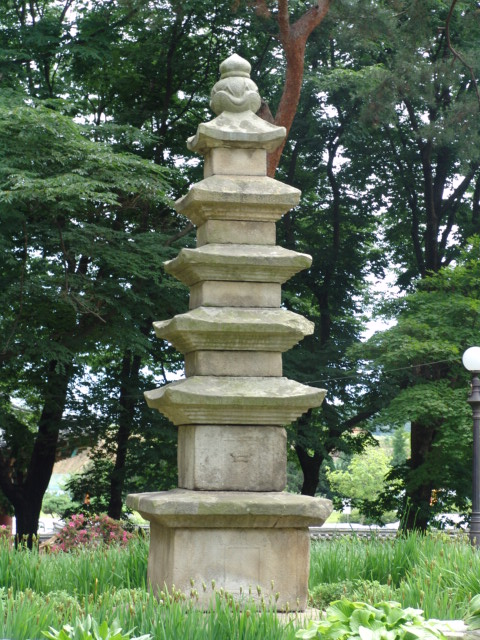
Yongjusa pagoda

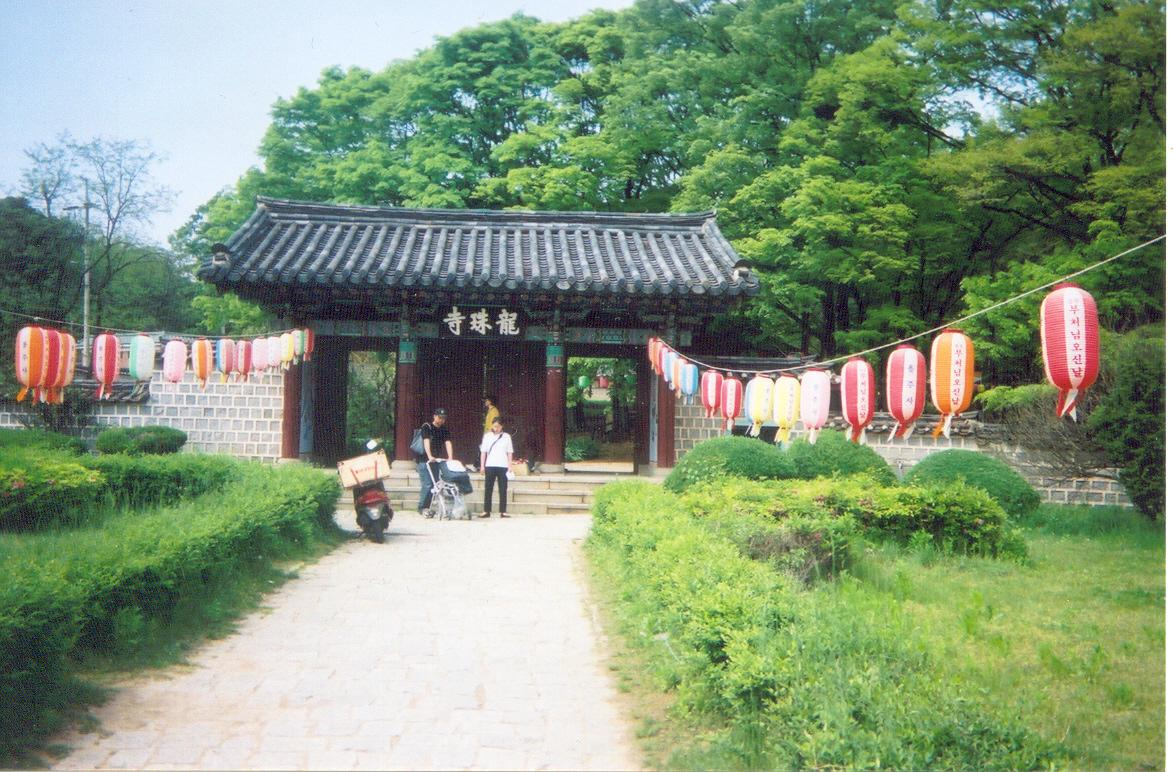
View of Yongjusa

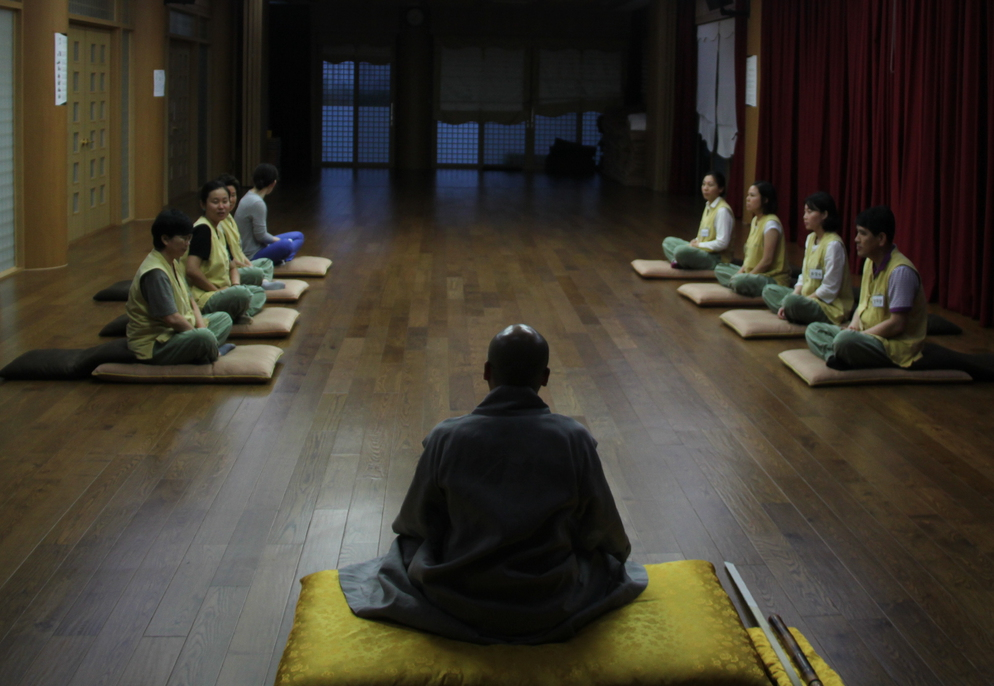
Templestay activity

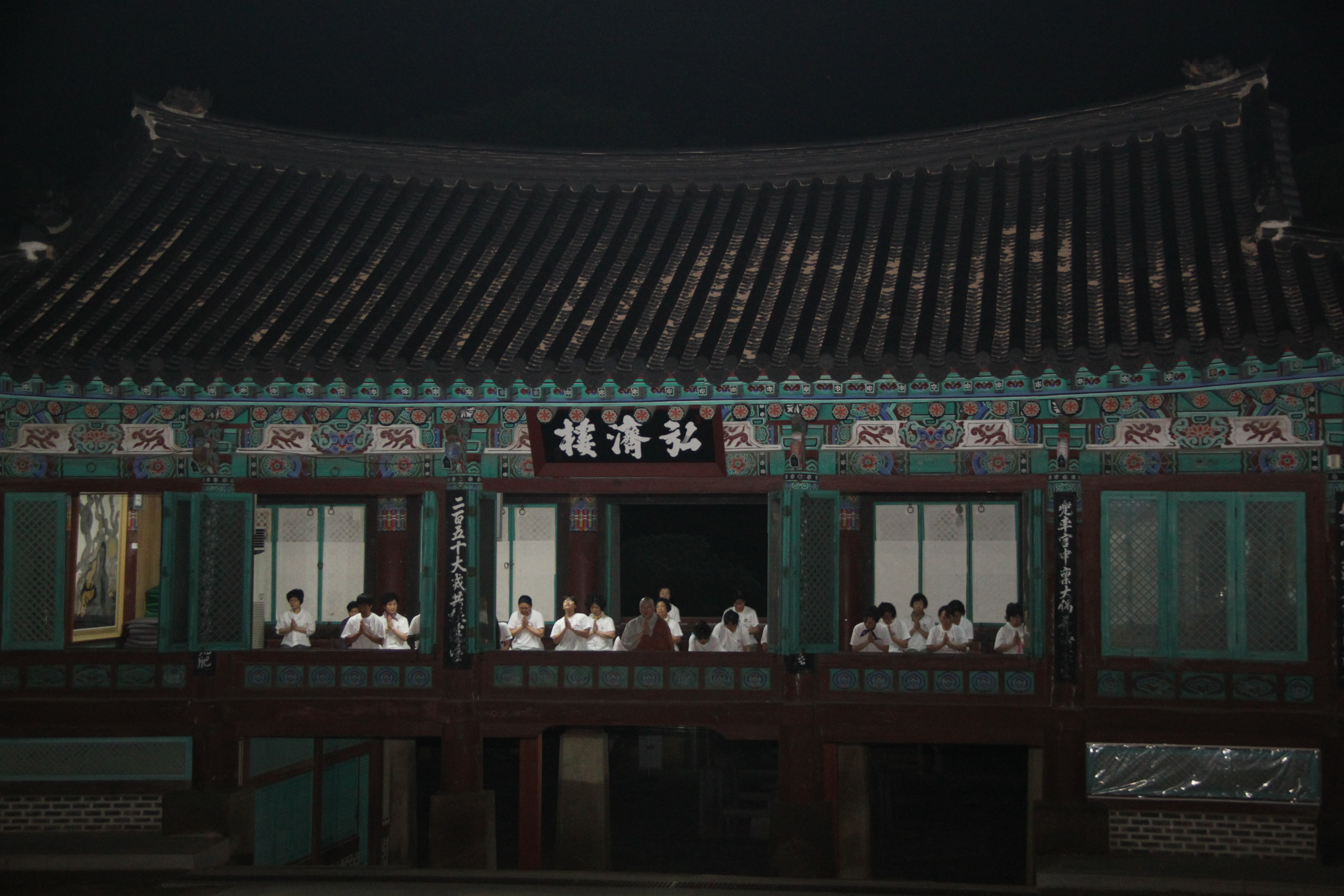
Templestay activity

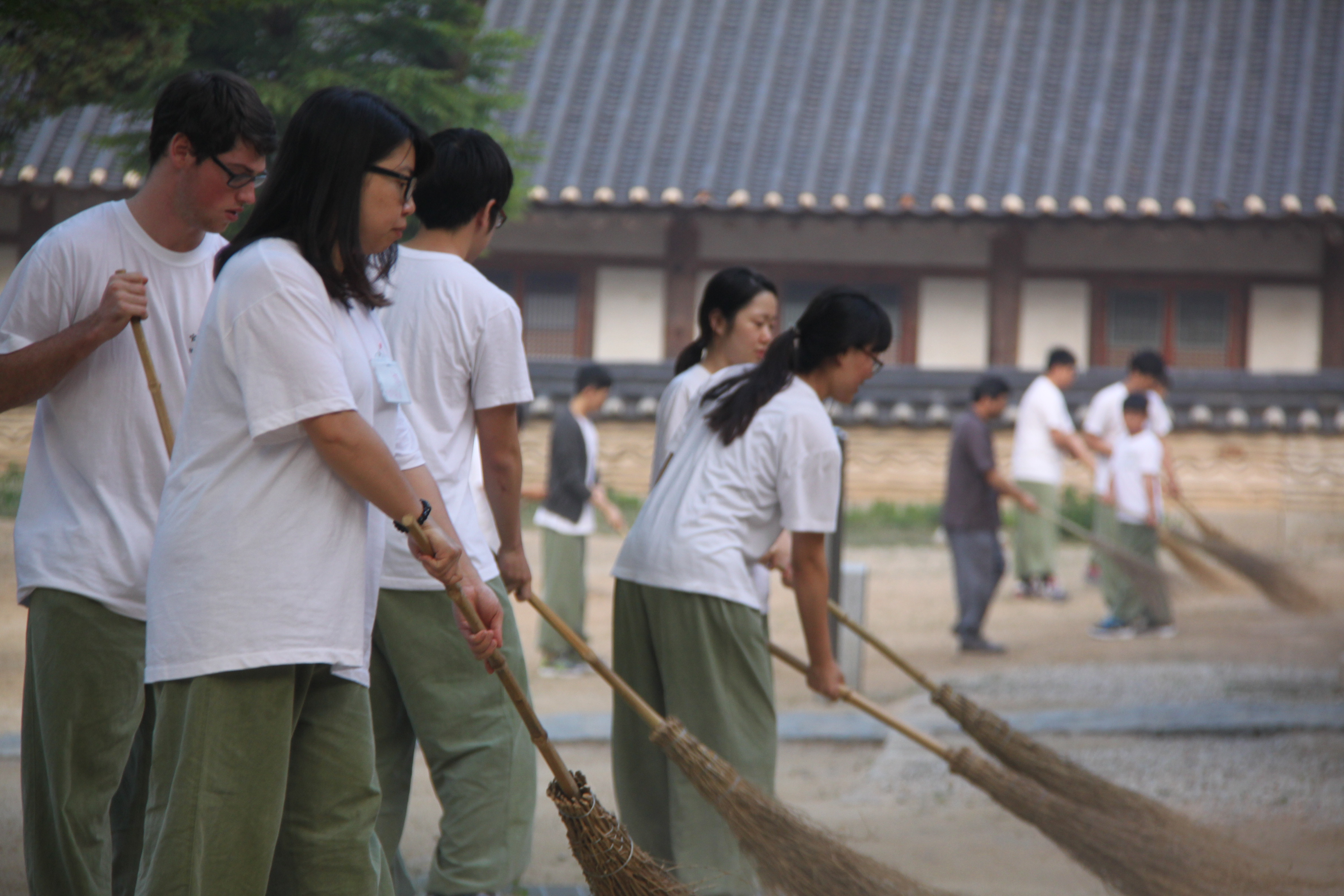
Templestay activity

== Templestay program ==
Yongjusa offers Templestay programs for visitors where visitors can experience Buddhist culture.

== See also ==
- Korean Buddhist temples
- Korean Buddhism
- Religion in South Korea
