= Seonunsa =

Buddhist temple in North Jeolla, South Korea

- 선운사
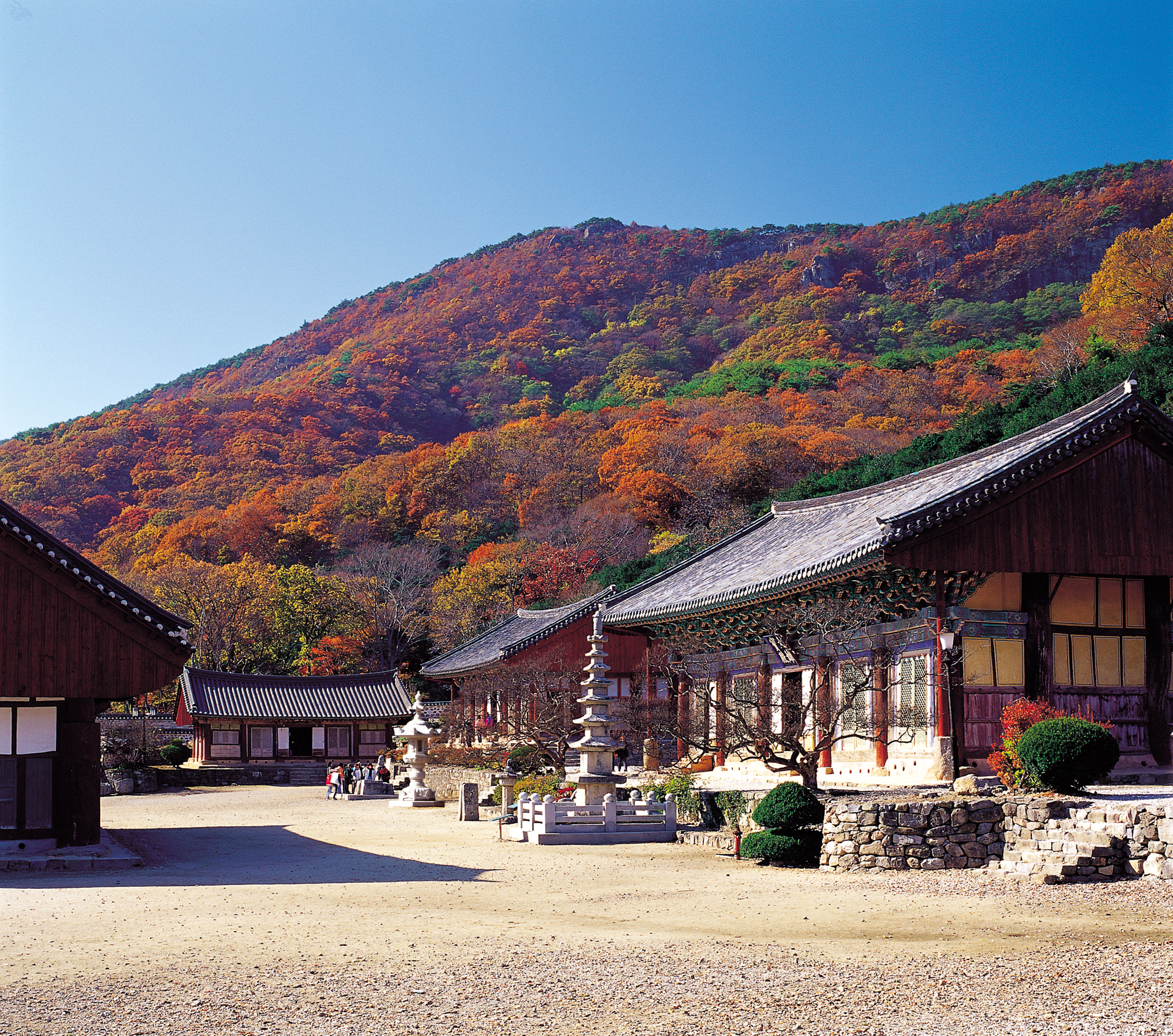
- View of Seonunsa Temple in South Korea

- Location within South Korea

Religion
- Affiliation: Jogye Order of Korean Buddhism

Location
- Location: 250 Seonunsa-ro Asan-myeon Gochang-gun North Jeolla Province (Korean: 전라북도 고창군 아산면 선운사로 250)
- Country: South Korea
- Coordinates: 35°29′49.3″N 126°34′42.9″E

Seonunsa (Korean: 선운사; Hanja: 禪雲寺) is a head temple of the Jogye Order of Korean Buddhism. It stands on the slopes of Dosolsan in Asan-myeon, Gochang County, near the Yellow Sea coast in western North Jeolla Province province.

== History ==
Seonunsa was established by Seon Master Geomdan in 577. Several stories have been passed down concerning its establishment. One legend says there used to be a large pond occupied by dragons where the temple is now located. As Ven. Geomdan was filling the pond with rocks to drive away the dragons, an eye disease spread through the village. The monk told the villagers that anyone who poured one bag of charcoal into the pond would be healed. People rushed in with bags of charcoal, and the pond was soon filled. Ven. Geomdan named the temple Seonun (禪雲; literally “Seon clouds”) to convey his vision of cultivating Seon dwelling in the clouds.

According to the Seonunsa sajeokgi (Seonunsa Records), compiled by Im U-sang in 1794, King Jinheung of the Silla Dynasty came here and established Seonunsa after abdicating the throne. It also says that King Jinheung established Jungae-am Hermitage for the eternal repose of Princess Jungae, and Dosol-am Hermitage (or Dosoram) for the eternal repose of Queen Consort Dosol, but these stories lack credibility. Seonunsa was rebuilt in 1318 by Seon Master Hyojeong, and again in 1474 by Seon Master Haengjo. The temple was reduced to ashes during the second Japanese invasion (1597–1598). Its reconstruction was undertaken again in 1614 by Seong Seok-jo, then governor of Mujang County, and took five years.

== Cultural properties ==
Seonunsa owns six items of state-designated heritage: a gilt-bronze seated Ksitigarbha Bodhisattva (Treasure No. 279); the Main Buddha Hall (Daeungjeon, Treasure No. 290); clay seated Vairocana Buddha (Treasure No. 1752); gilt-bronze seated Ksitigarbha Bodhisattva of Dosoram (Treasure No. 279), a hermitage associated with Seonunsa; stone Buddha Bas-Relief of Dosoram (Treasure No. 1200); and the Main Buddha Hall of Chamdangam (Treasure No. 803), another associated hermitage. In addition, Seonunsa oversees three designated natural monuments: the Forest of Common Camellias (Natural Monument No. 184), the Jangsasong Pine Tree (Natural Monument No. 354), and Songak Ivy (Natural Monument No. 367). The temple also possesses 19 items of tangible cultural heritage, including the stele of Vinaya Master Baekpa (Tangible Cultural Heritage of North Jeolla Province No. 122), with an inscription based on the calligraphy of the noted calligrapher Kim Jeong-hui.

Naewongung Hall (Cultural Heritage Material of North Jeolla Province No. 125), located at Dosoram Hermitage, is one of three major Ksitigarbha Bodhisattva prayer sites in Korea. Established on top of a steep rock cliff, it attracts numerous pilgrims all year long. Below Naewongung Hall, the stone Buddha bas-relief is carved into the rock cliff. One legend says Seon Master Geomdan hid a secret text in a niche carved around the navel of the Buddha bas-relief and that during the Donghak Peasant Revolution of 1894, one of the rebels removed it. Above Naewongung is Yongmun Cave, “Dragon Gate Cave,” which is said to have been made by the dragon cast out of his pond by Seon Master Geomdan.

The stele of Vinaya Master Baekpa is a monument to the master, a great expert in Avatamsaka studies. After Ven. Baekpa died, Kim Jeong-hui (aka Chusa), who had debated Seon Buddhism with him, grieved over his death and wrote the content for its inscription. In part it says: “In the past I shared opinions about Seon with Baekpa through repeated correspondence, which is greatly different from the vain talk of the grape vine. About this only Baekpa and I know the content in full. Even if I try to tell people about it over and over in ten thousand different ways, no one can understand it. When can I get Baekpa to return and laugh with me once more?”

There is a camellia forest behind the main hall (daeungjeon) of the temple. The trees are roughly 500 years old, and are designated by South Korea as a natural monument. The temple is known for its worship of the Ksitigarbha Bodhisattva, and for its annual camellia festival.

== Gallery ==
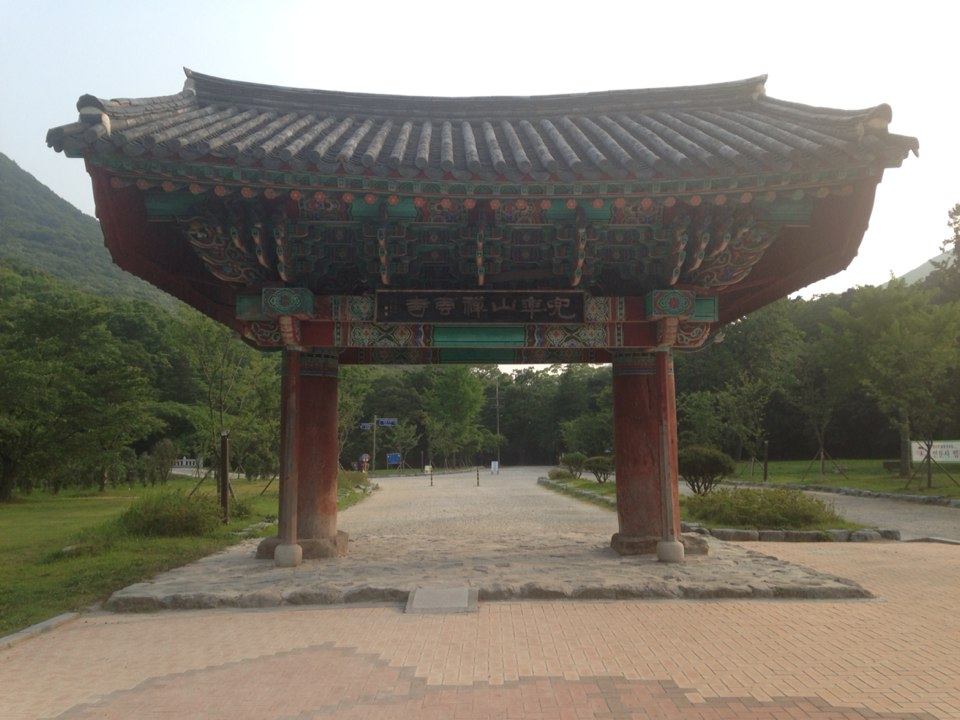

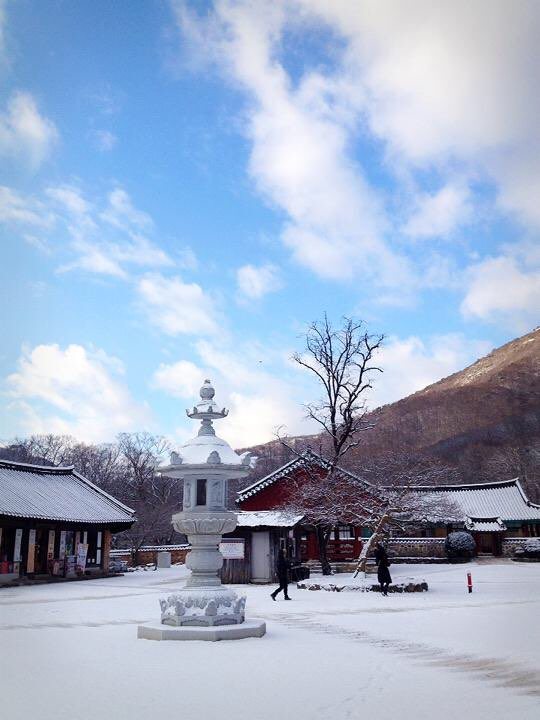

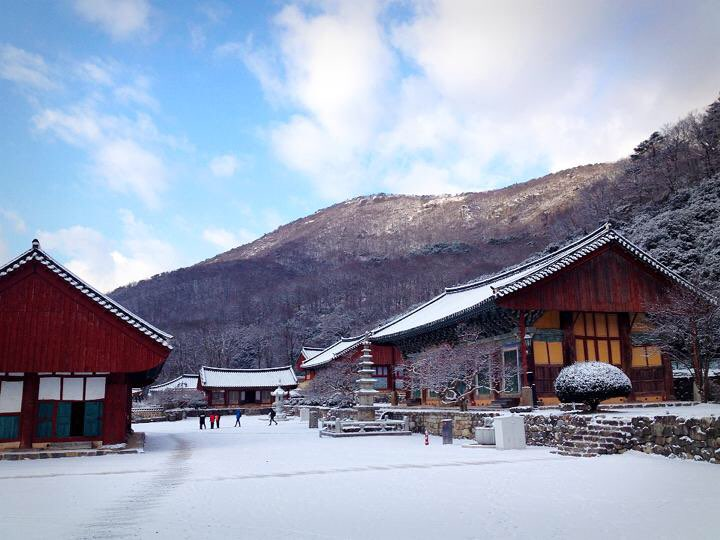

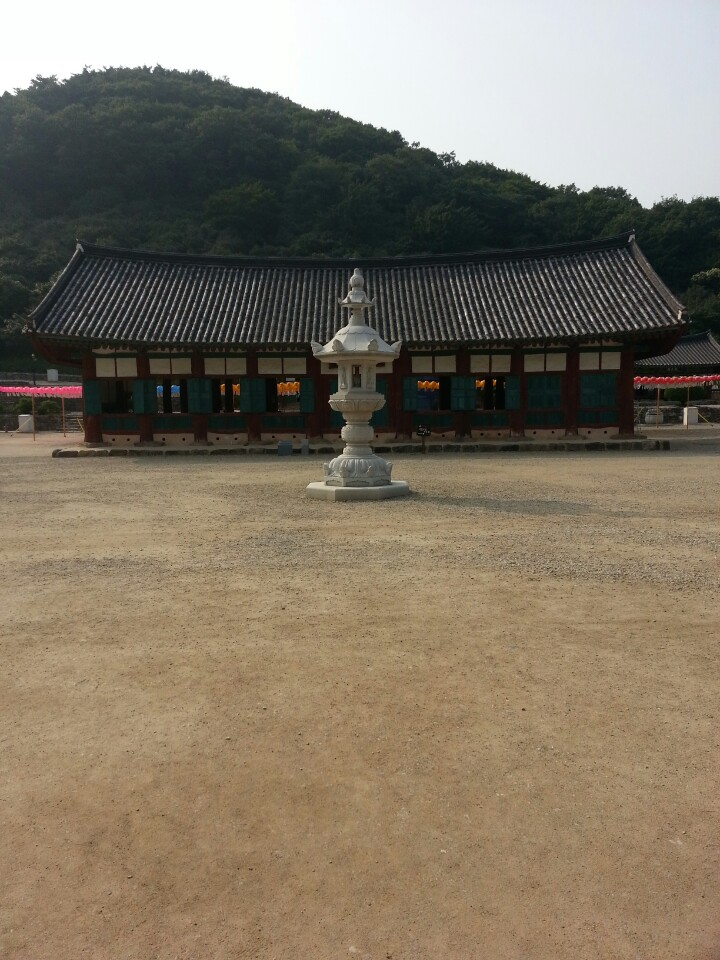

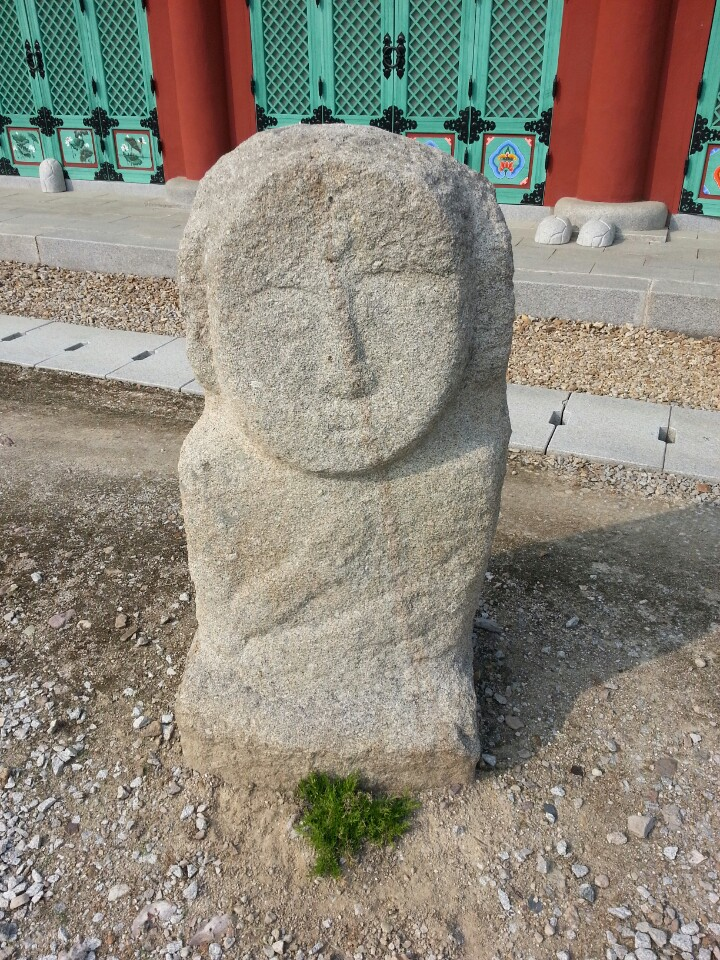

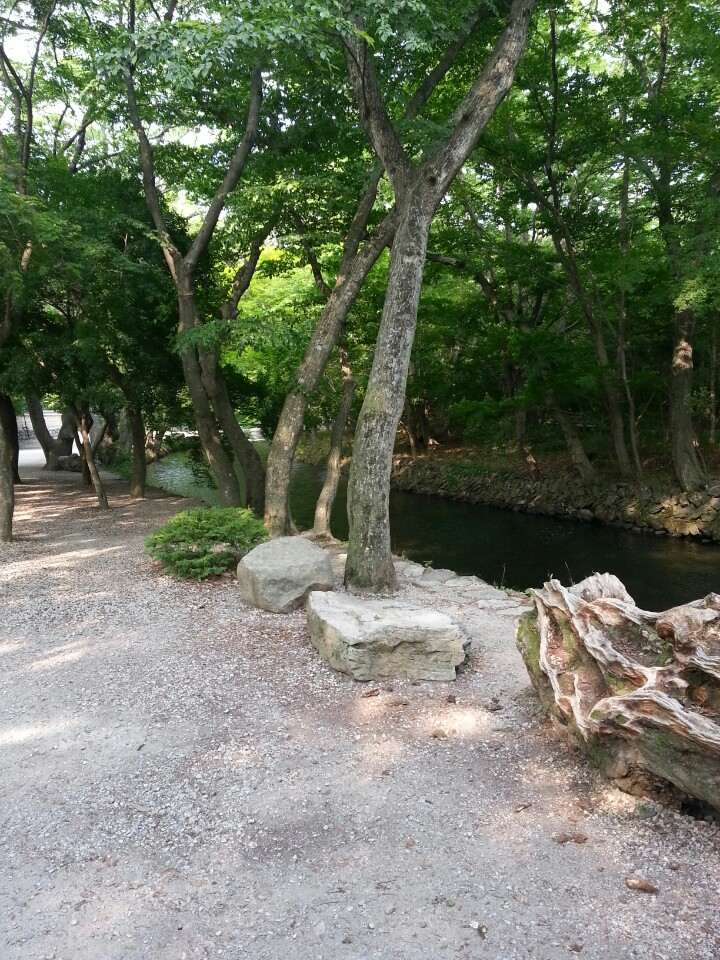

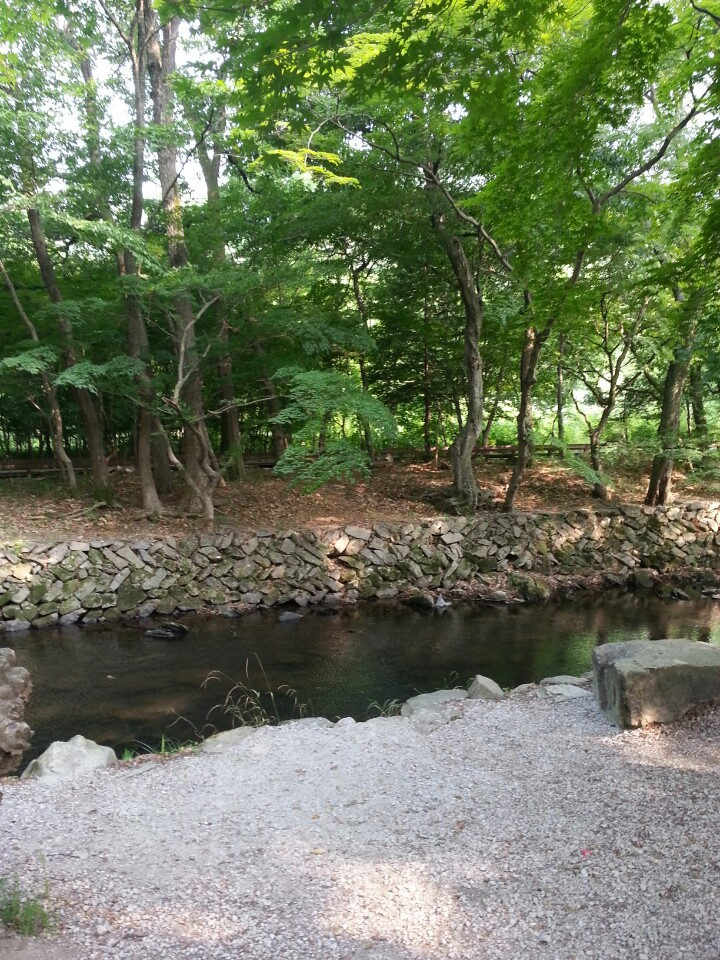

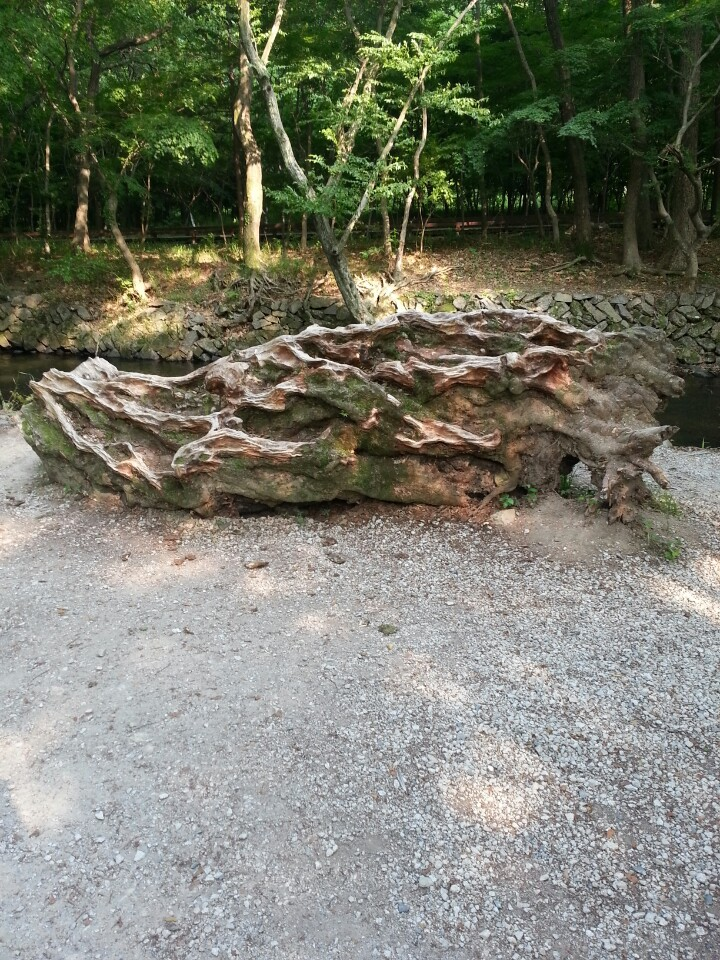

== Tourism ==
It also offers temple stay programs where visitors can experience Buddhist culture.

== See also ==
- Religion in South Korea
- Korean Buddhist temples
