= Jogyesa =

Buddhist temple in Seoul, South Korea

- 조계사
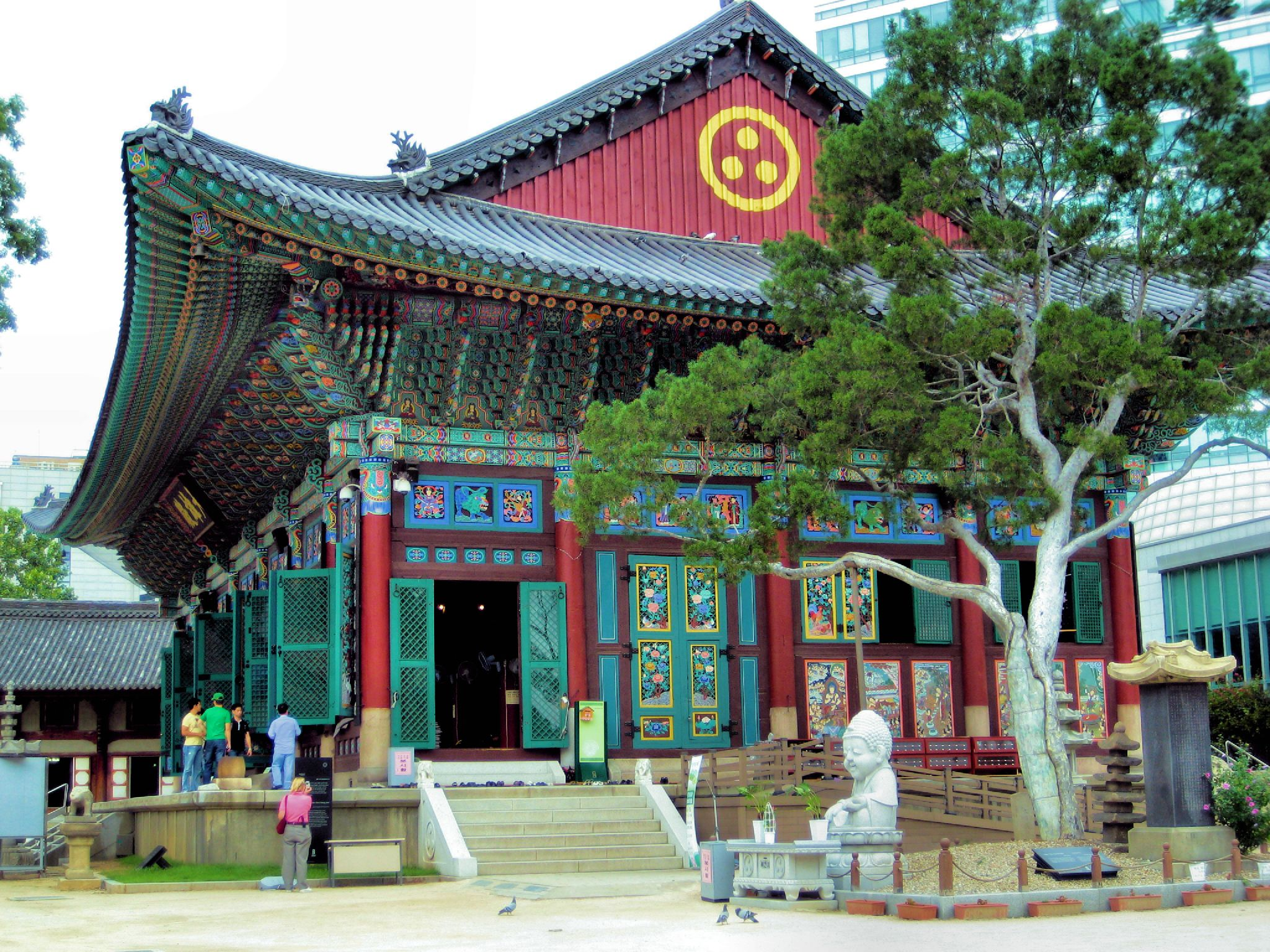
- Interactive map of the Jogyesa area

General information
- Architectural style: Korean
- Location: Jongno District, Seoul, South Korea
- Coordinates: 37°34′26.09″N 126°58′54.85″E
- Construction started: 1395

Korean name
- Hangul: 조계사
- Hanja: 曹溪寺
- RR: Jogyesa
- MR: Chogyesa

Jogyesa (Korean: 조계사; lit. 'Jogye Temple') is the chief temple of the Jogye Order of Korean Buddhism. The building dates back to the late 14th century and became the order's chief temple in 1936. It thus plays a leading role in the current state of Seon Buddhism in South Korea. The temple was first established in 1395, at the dawn of the Joseon period; the modern temple was founded in 1910 and initially called "Gakhwangsa". The name was changed to "Taegosa" during the period of Japanese rule, and then to the present name in 1954.

Jogyesa is located in Gyeonji-dong, Jongno District, in downtown Seoul. Natural monument No. 9, an ancient white pine tree, is located within the temple grounds. Jogyesa Temple is located in one of the most popular cultural streets in Seoul, Insa-dong, near the Gyeongbokgung Palace.

This temple participates in the Templestay program, where visitors can sign up to experience the life of Buddhist monks at the temple, eat Buddhist food, and learn the history of the temple and of Korean Buddhism as a whole.

== History ==
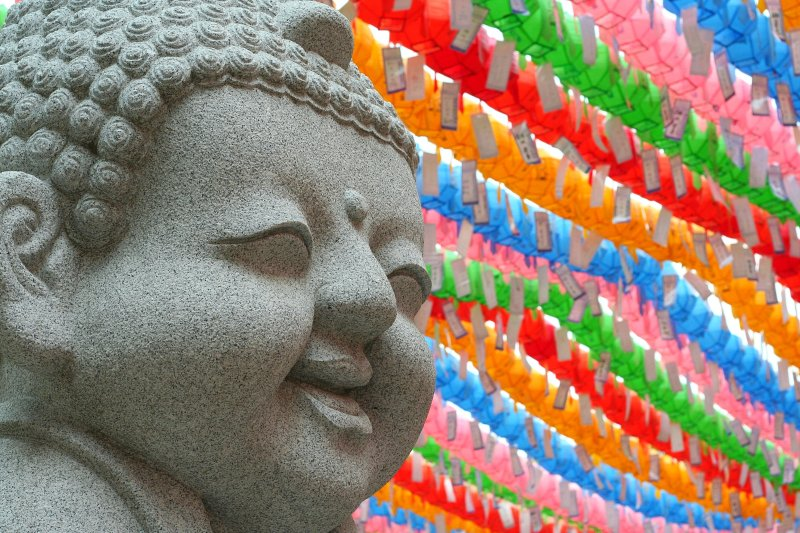
Seoul, Jogyesa

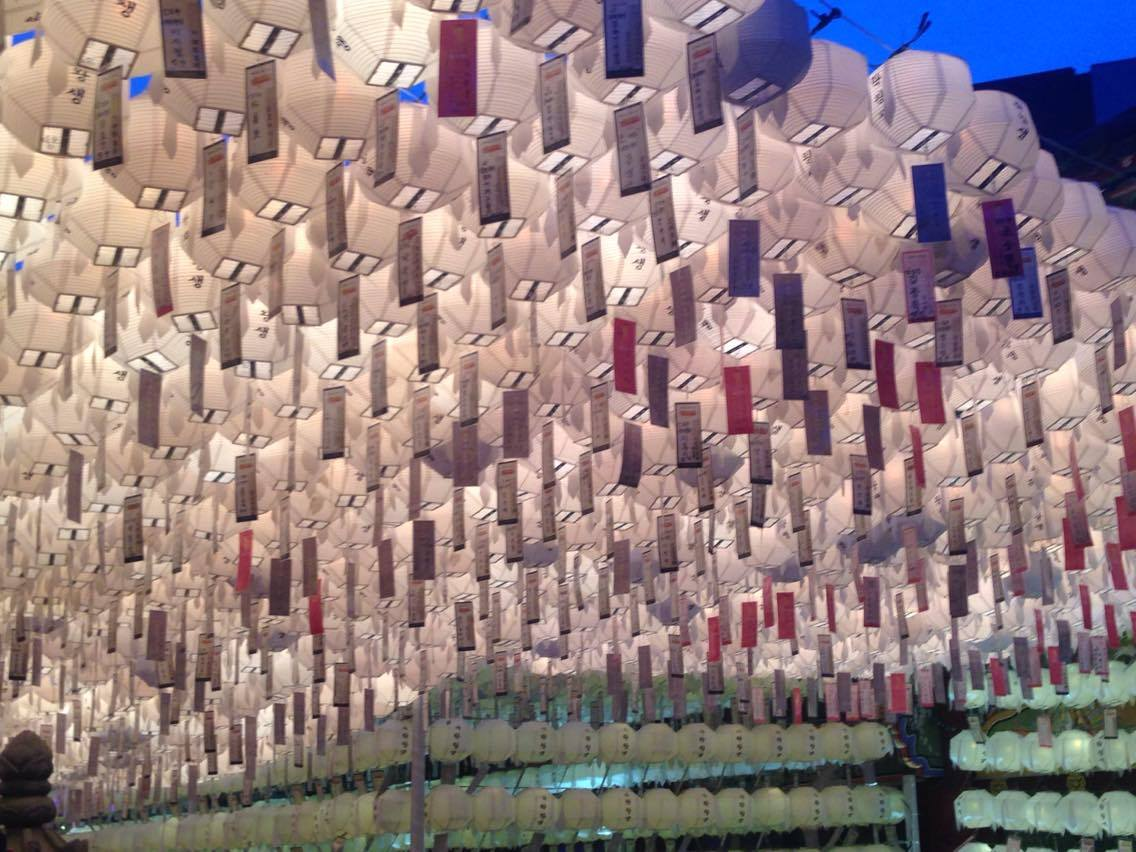
Lanterns in Jogyesa

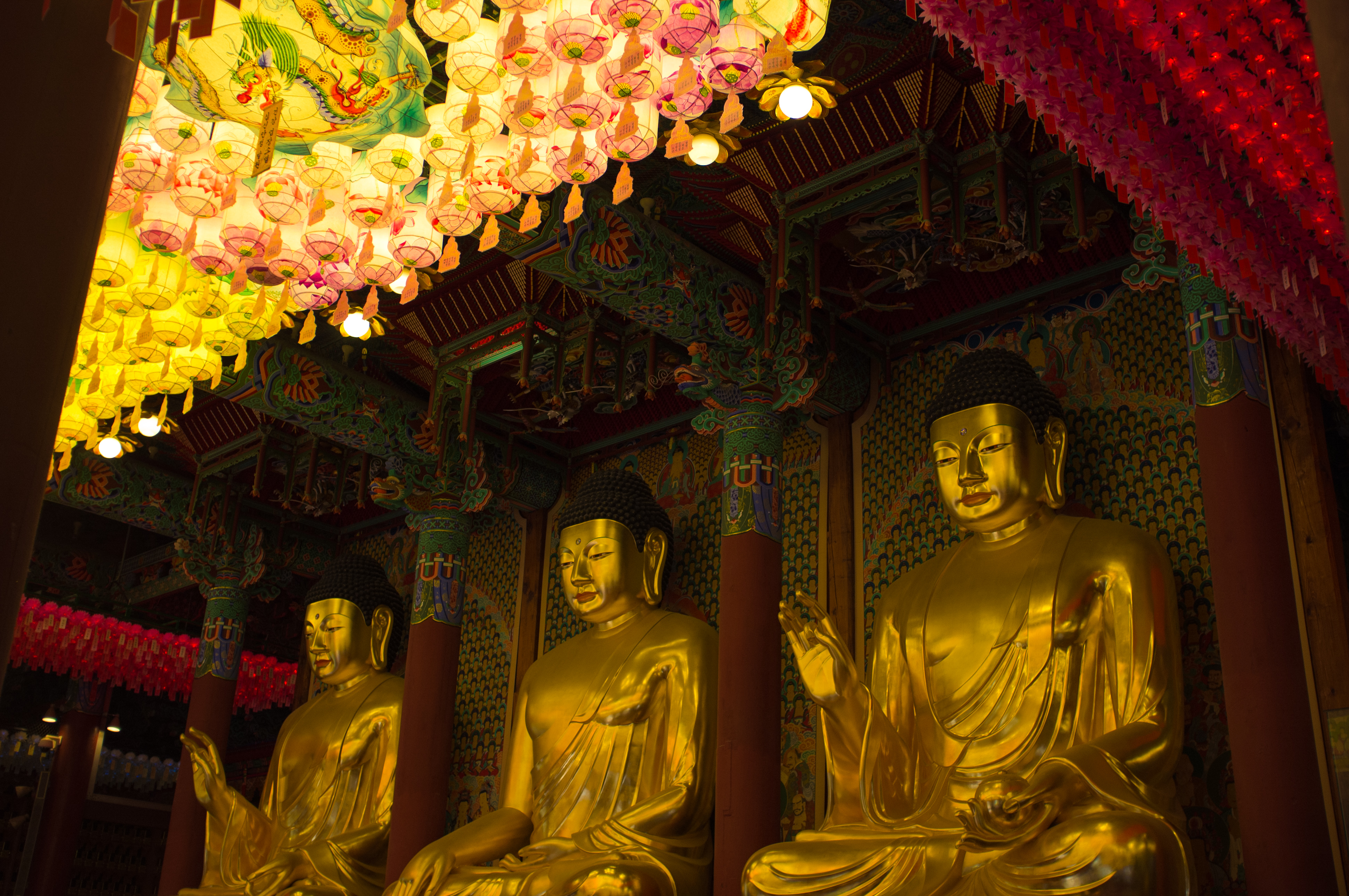
Statues of Buddha at Jogyesa

The Jogyesa Temple used to be known as Gakhwangsa Temple which was founded in 1395. During the Japanese colonial period (1910–1945), the temple become one of the strongest fortresses of Korean Buddhism. Gakhawangsa Temple emerged as the temple of the resistance to Japanese efforts to suppress Korean Buddhism. In 1937, a movement for the establishment of a Central Headquarters began which was successful with the building of the Main Buddha Hall of Jogyesa Temple in Seoul in 1938.

The temple became known as Taegosa Temple in 1938 and by its current name of Jogyesa Temple in 1954. The name Jogyesa Temple was chosen to denote the structure's status as the main temple of the Jogye Order of Korean Buddhism (Buddhist sect which combines and integrates the Korean Zen and Textual Schools of Buddhism). The Jogye Order has 1700 years of history and is the most representative of Korean Buddhism Orders. The Jogye Order is based on the Seokgamoni doctrine and teachings of the Buddha, and it focuses on the mind and nature of this.

The Daeungjeon (Main Buddha Hall) was constructed in 1938 of pine wood from Baekdu Mountain, and it's always filled with the sounds of chanting. In the main temple courtyard there are two trees which are 500 years old, a White Pine and a Chinese Scholar tree.

The White Pine tree is about 10 meters high and gave the nearby area "Susong-dong" its name (Song means 'pine tree'). This tree was brought by Chinese missionaries during the Joseon period. This pine tree sits besides the Main Hall, and its branch towards the Main Hall is only partially alive. One side of this tree is adjacent to the passage, while the other side sits next to the building. Therefore, because the area is inadequate for the tree to grow, the Lacebark pine is not preserved well and since the Lacebark pine is a rare tree species and is valuable in biology, it is designated and protected as a Natural Monument.

The Chinese Scholar tree, which is 26 meters tall and four meters in circumference, silently stands watch over the temple grounds.

== Layout ==
Jogyesa Temple's features is a mix of traditional temple and palace architecture. The lattice designs found on the doors and windows of the Daeungjeon are unique in their own right. The temple also features the Geuknakjeon (Hll of Supreme Bliss) in which the Amitabha Buddha is enshrined, the Beomjongnu, a structure where a bell which enlightens the public with its sound is housed, and an information center for foreign nationals.

The Temple also has colorful matsya (Sanskrit for "fish") which is sacred to Hindu-Buddhists as it is one of the avatar (incarnation) of Hindu deity Vishnu which has been described in detail in Matsya Purana and 6th BCE Buddhist text Anguttara Nikaya.

To enter the temple, visitors must pass through the Iljumun or "one pillar gate". The Iljumun is an entry that represents is the division that separates the mortal world from the world of Buddha.

== Events ==
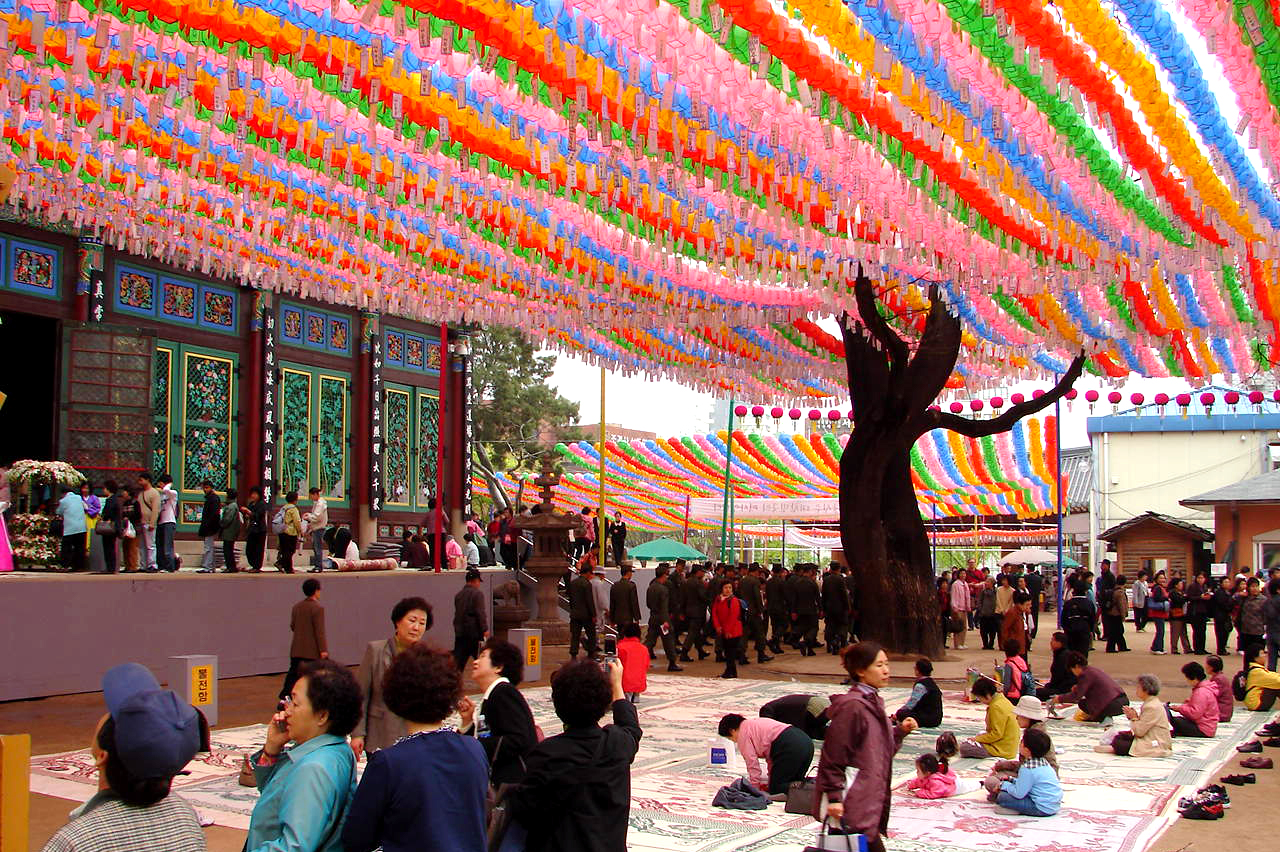

- Buddha's Birthday

The festival, designated Korea's Important Intangible Cultural Property No. 122, will take place at Jogyesa and Bongeunsa temples and along Jongno Street from May 6 to 8. The origin of the three-day festival dates back to the Unified Silla era over 1,300 years ago, when the festival was held on Daeboreum, a day celebrating the first full moon of the lunar calendar. During the Goryeo Dynasty (918-1392), Yeondeunghoe turned into a festival marking Buddha's birthday.

Lanterns featuring lotus and other traditional figures and objects representing people's wishes will be hung from May 6 to 22, from 6 p.m. to midnight at Jogyesa Temple The highlight of the three-day-long celebration is the Lotus Lantern Parade, which winds along Jongno Street from Dongdaemun Gate to Jogyesa Temple. With thousands of participants, each carrying their own lantern, the parade becomes a river of light flowing through the heart of Seoul.

- Jogye Order

Jogyesa came to the attention of the international news media in December 1998 due to several monks occupying the temple in a power struggle between factions of the Jogye Order. In the end, riot police were called in to take control of the temple and oust the protestors after they had occupied the building for more than 40 days.

- Kyeongsin Persecution

From 27 to 31 October 1980, during the Kyeongsin Persecution, the government raided major Buddhist temples throughout the country, including the headquarters at Seoul's Jogyesa, under the guise of anti-government investigations and an attempt to "purify" Buddhism.

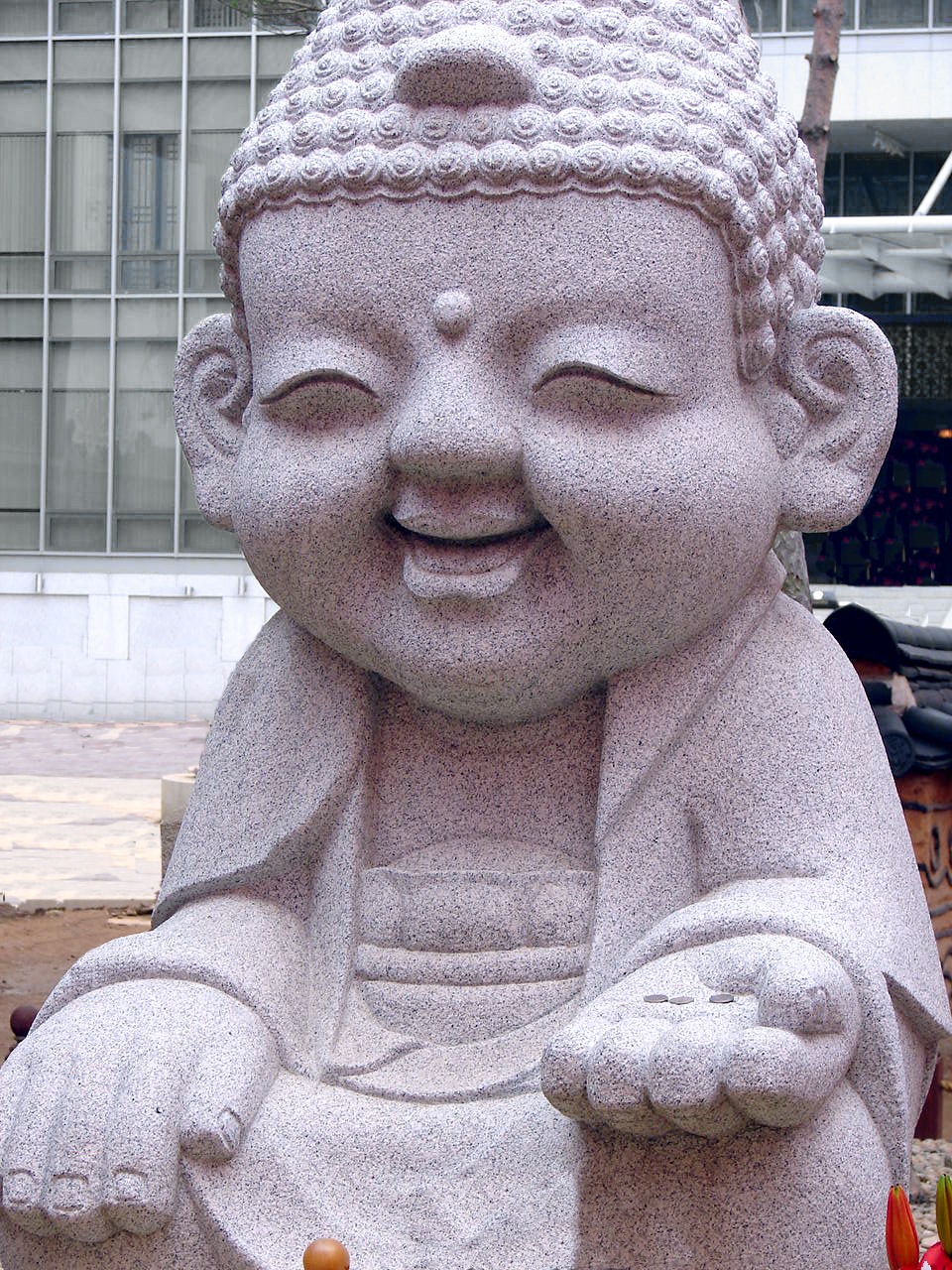

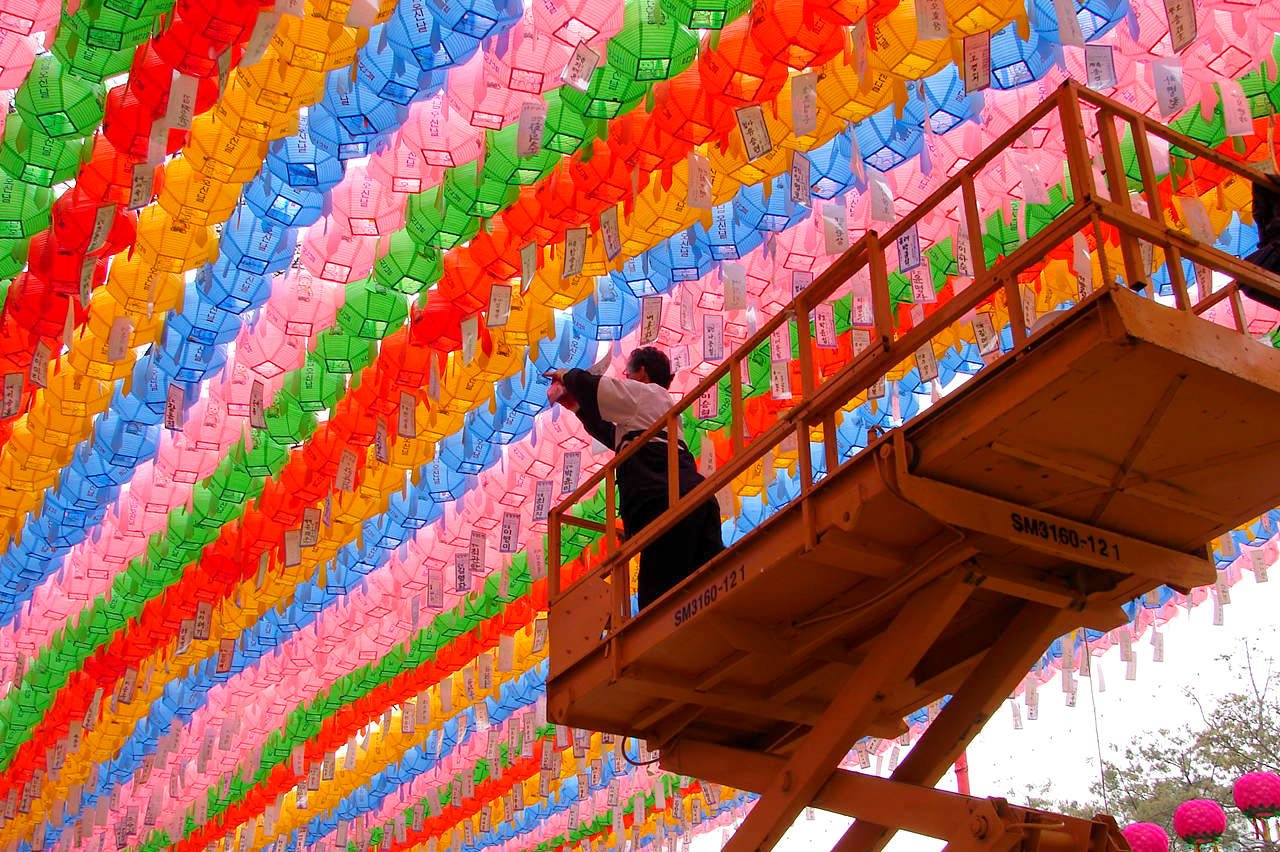

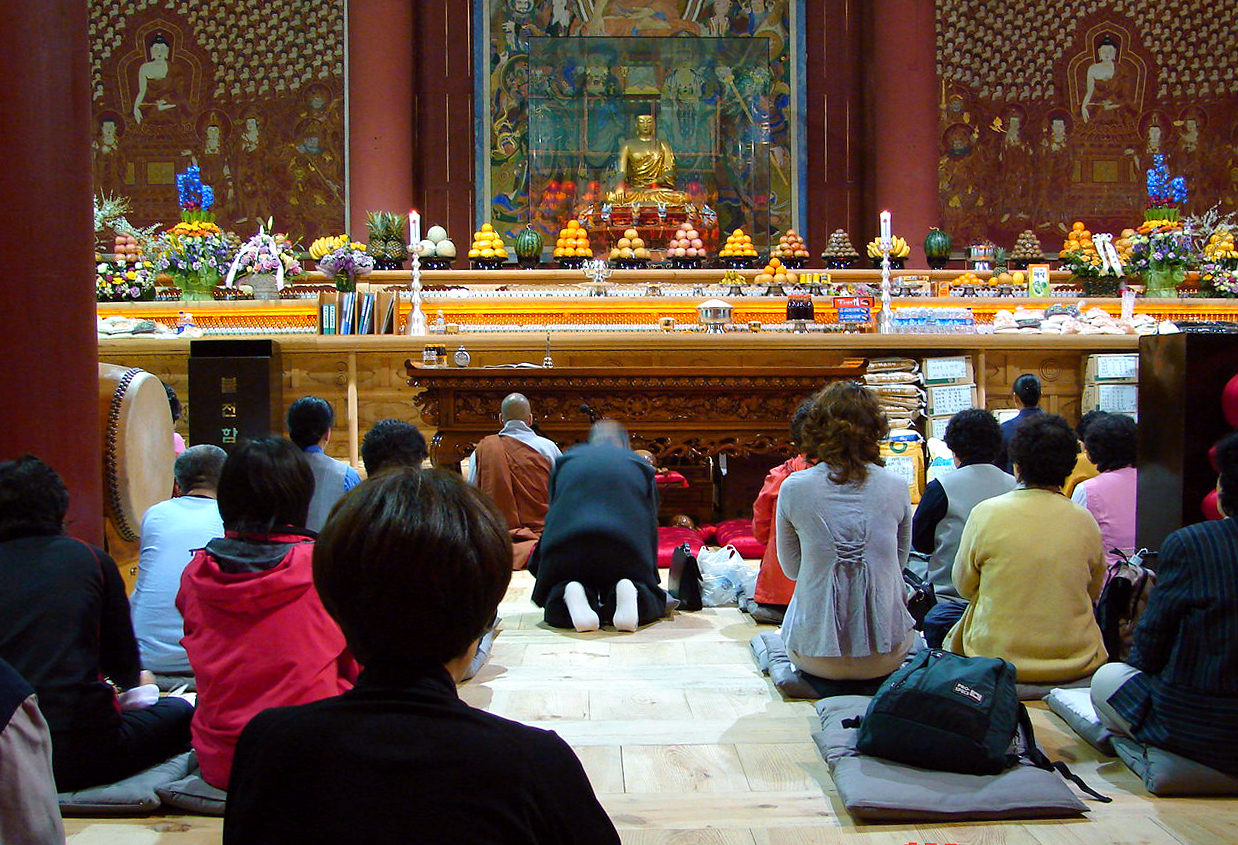

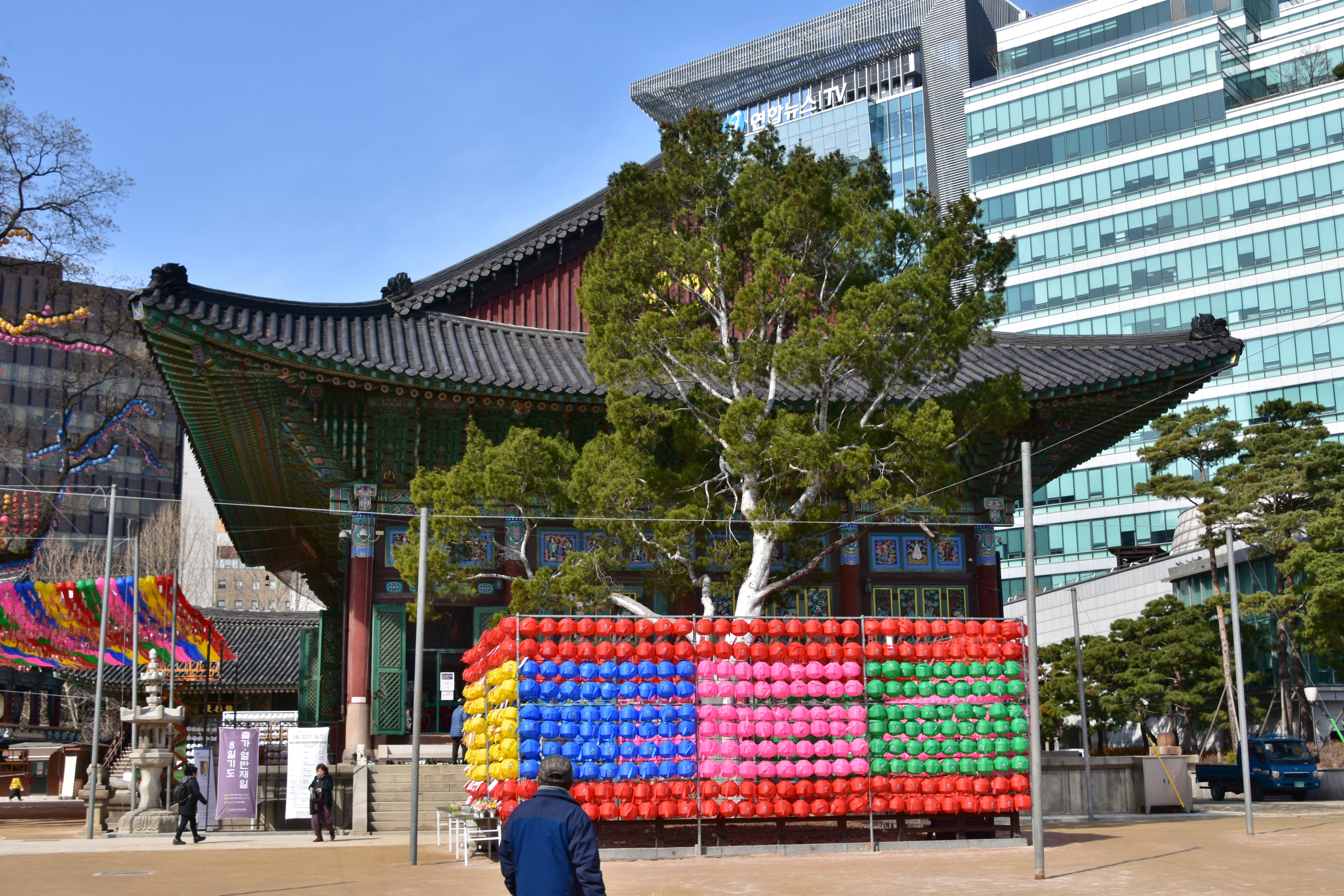

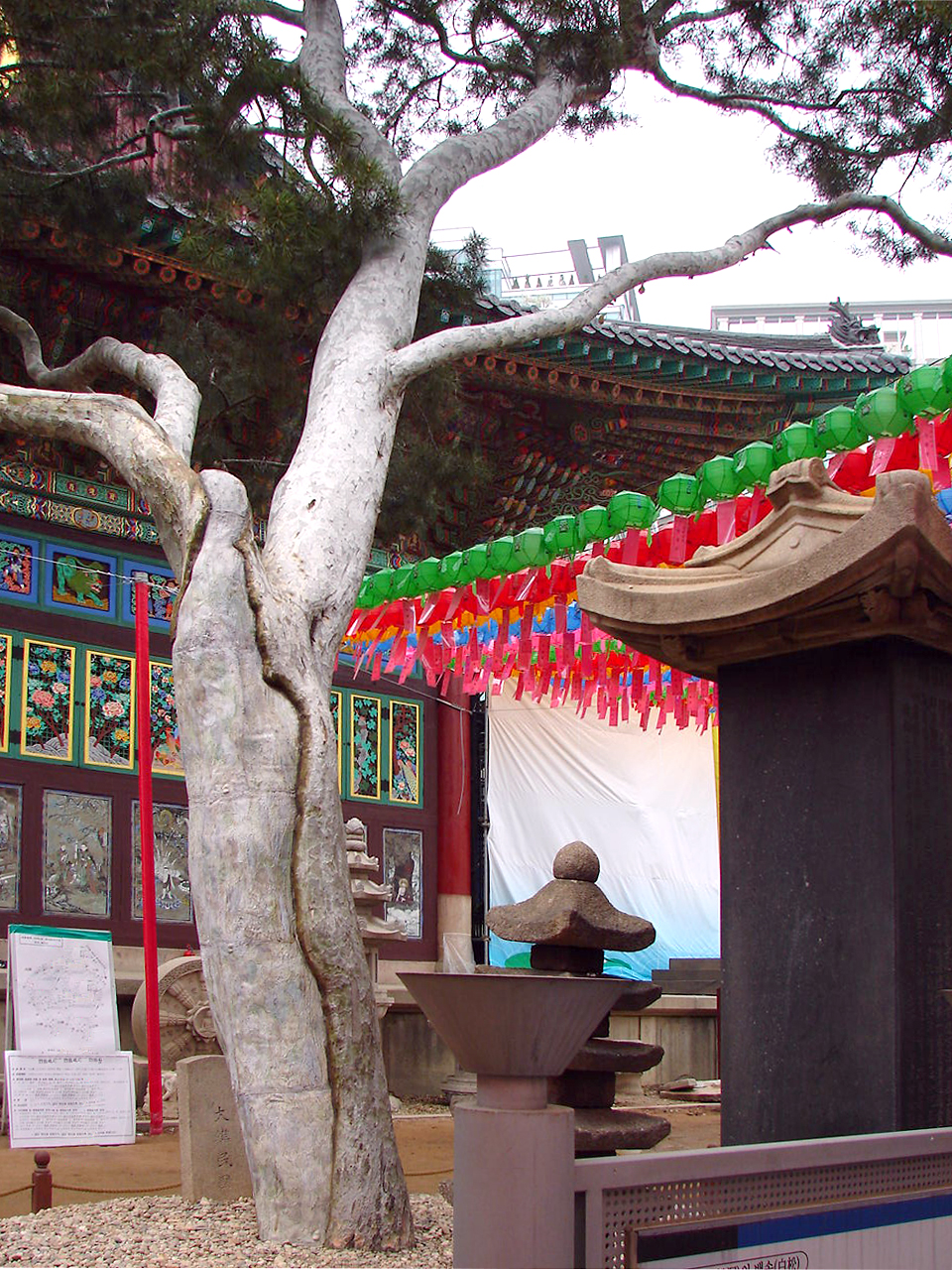

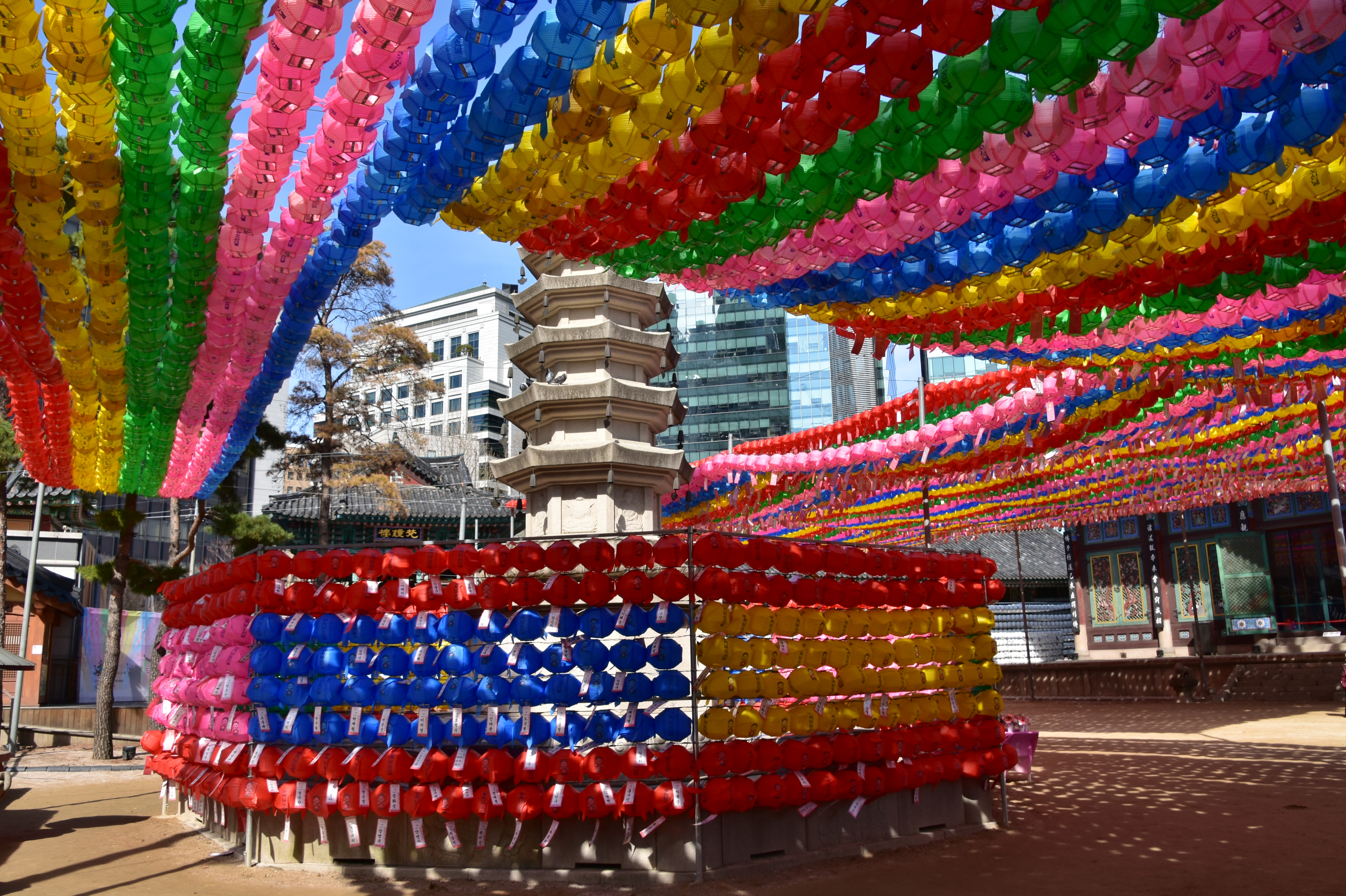

== See also ==
- List of Buddhist temples in Seoul
- Buddhist temples in South Korea
- Religion in South Korea
- Religion in Korea
