= Magoksa =

Buddhist temple in Gongju, South Korea

- 마곡사
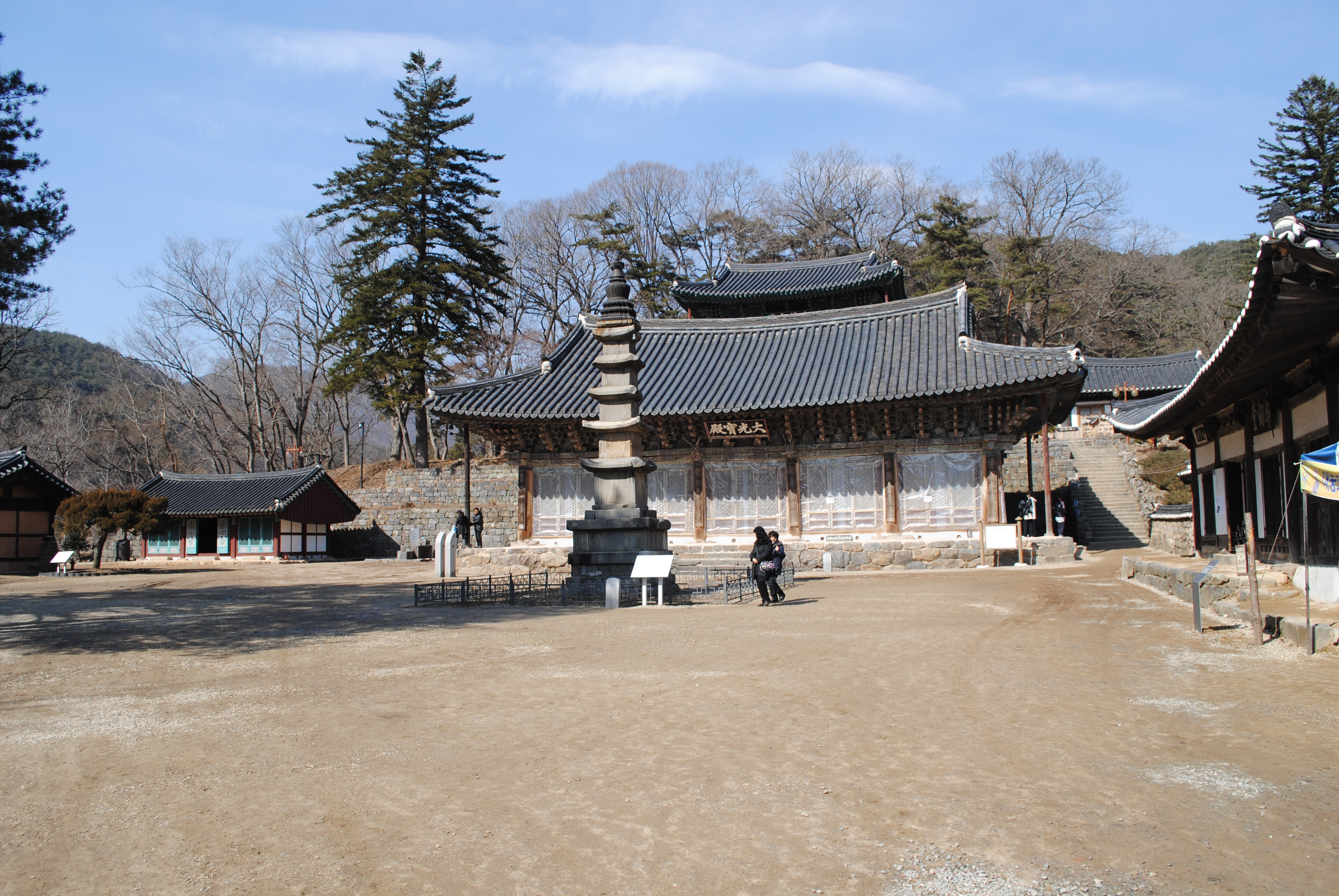
- View of Magoksa Temple in South Korea

- Location within South Korea

Religion
- Affiliation: Jogye Order of Korean Buddhism

Location
- Location: 966 Magoksa-ro Sagok-myeon, Gongju, South Chungcheong Province, South Korea
- Country: South Korea
- Coordinates: 36°33′32″N 127°00′44″E

Architecture
- UNESCO World Heritage Site
- Criteria: Cultural: iii
- Designated: 2018
- Parent listing: Sansa, Buddhist Mountain Monasteries in Korea
- Reference no.: 1562-5

Magoksa (Korean: 마곡사; Hanja: 麻谷寺; lit. 'Hemp Valley Temple') is a head temple of the Jogye Order of Korean Buddhism in Gongju, South Korea. It is located on the eastern slope of Taehwasan, on taegeuk-shaped bend in the Taegeukcheon Stream.

It also offers temple stay programs where visitors can experience Buddhist culture.

== History ==
Magoksa was established in 640 by Vinaya Master Jajang Yulsa, who also built Tongdosa Temple upon his return from China. Silla's Queen Seondeok then gave him 200 gyeol (an ancient measurement of land estimated at 6,800 square meters) of land on which he built a brick pagoda and Magoksa. The name "Magoksa" originated with Ven. Bocheol Hwasang, a monk who lived there later, because the way many people gathered to listen to his Dharma talks reminded him of hemp stalks closely packed together.

Magoksa was closed during the turbulent transition period between the Goryeo dynasty and the Joseon dynasty. From then on the temple became a hideout for thieves for about 200 years. Finally, in 1172, Ven. Jinul (also Chinul or Bojo Guksa) drove out the thieves and renovated the temple with the help of his disciple Ven. Su-u. Joseon's King Sejo visited the temple and personally wrote the plaque for Yeongsanjeon Hall. The king also left behind the palanquin he rode in on his trip to Magoksa.

During the Japanese invasion (1592–1597), most of the temple's buildings were burned down. In 1651 some buildings, Daeungjeon, Yeongsanjeon and Daejeok-gwangjeon, were reconstructed. During the period of the Korean Empire (1897–1910), Kim Gu (金九, pen name: Baekbeom) came to Magoksa after escaping from Incheon Prison, and temporarily lived a monastic life under the Dharma name Wonjong. Kim Gu had been imprisoned after killing a Japanese military officer who had conspired with the murderers of Empress Myeongseong. The juniper tree growing in front of Daegwang-bojeon Hall is said to have been planted by Kim Gu himself.

== Legend ==
Legend tells us that when Jajang came to the eastern slope of Taehwasan where Magoksa is found he decided to establish a temple and call it magok, which means Flax Valley. Jajang felt that many good priests could come from the area "to cause the rapid growth of Buddhism", like the rapid growth of the flax plant that grows here.

== Cultural Properties ==
According to geomantic theory, the terrain of the mountains and rivers around Magoksa forms the "taegeuk" design and so it was selected as one of Joseon's ten utopian sites, places safe from war and disaster, by geomancy books like Taengniji (Guide for Choosing Desirable Settlement-sites) and Jeonggamnok (The Prophetic Writings of Jeong). That may be why Magoksa has many timeless pieces of cultural heritage. One must first appreciate the calligraphy of the name plaques that deck the Dharma halls, which can easily be missed.

First is the calligraphy on the plaque of Daeung-bojeon, the Main Buddha Hall. Written by Kim Saeng, one of the four great calligraphers of Silla and Goryeo, the characters display the energy and talent of the writer. Next is the plaque of Yeongsanjeon which has "Sejo-daewang-eopil (世祖大王御筆)," meaning "Written by King Sejo" in the upper left hand corner. It may have been written when the king stopped by Magoksa on his way to Onyang or Mt. Songnisan. Another is the plaque of Daegwang-bojeon, written by Gang Se-hwang who excelled in literature, art and calligraphy, and taught such disciples as Sin Wi and Kim Hong-do.

Then there is the plaque of Simgeomdang written by Jo Yun-hyeong, an honorable government official during the reign of King Jeongjo. The plaque reading "Magoksa" that hangs on the dormitory was created by Kim Gyu-jin, an artist of the modern era, by adding a simple painting around the writing.

- Treasure #799 – Magoksa houses a five-storey, Ocheung Stone pagoda. The pagoda is one of only three in the world the top embellished with bronze, suggesting influence from Tibetan (Lama) Buddhism.
- Treasure #800 – Yeongsanjeon
- Treasure #801 – Daeungbojeon
- Treasure #802 – Daegwangbojeon
- Treasure #1260 – Gaebultaeng of Buddha, a woodblock print from the 13th year (1687) of King Sukjong, in color on hemp cloth.

== Gallery ==
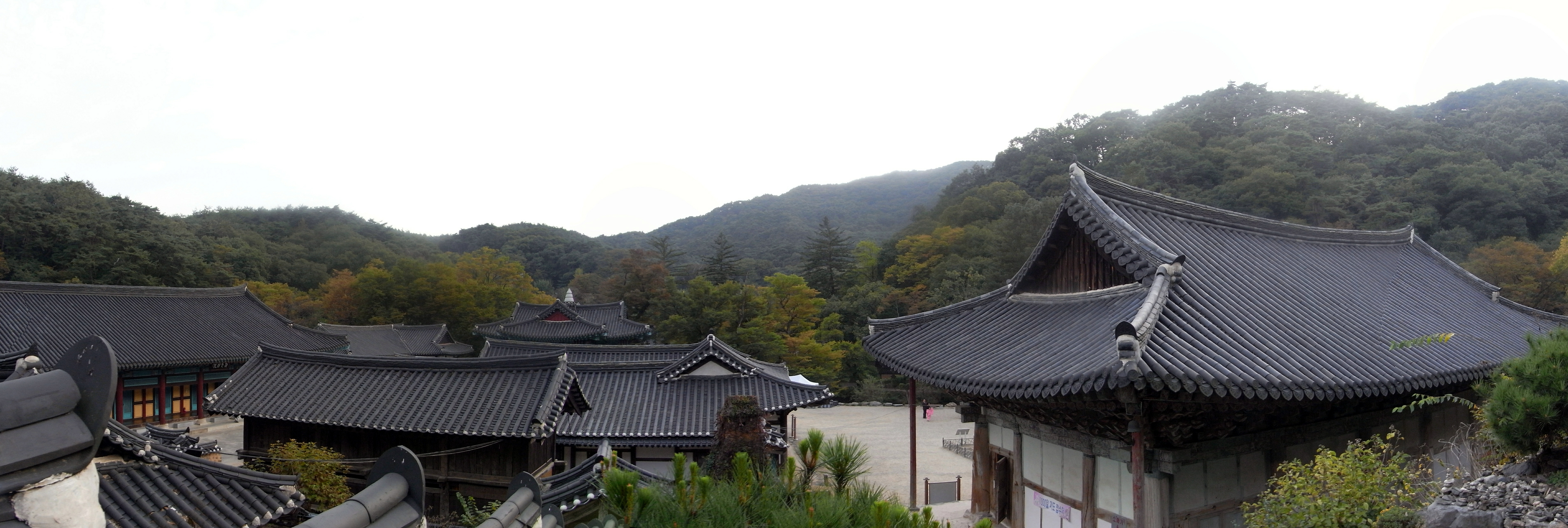

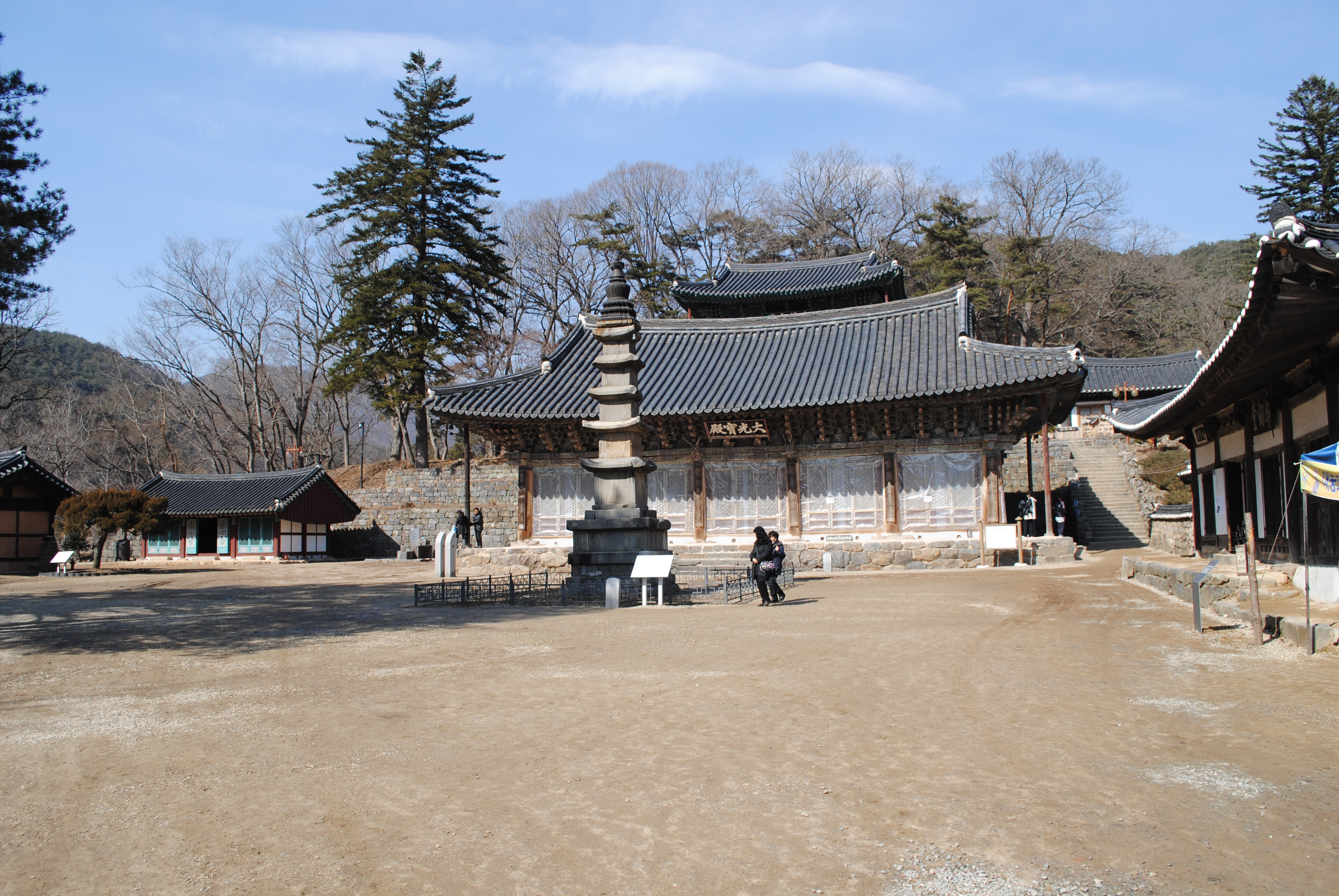

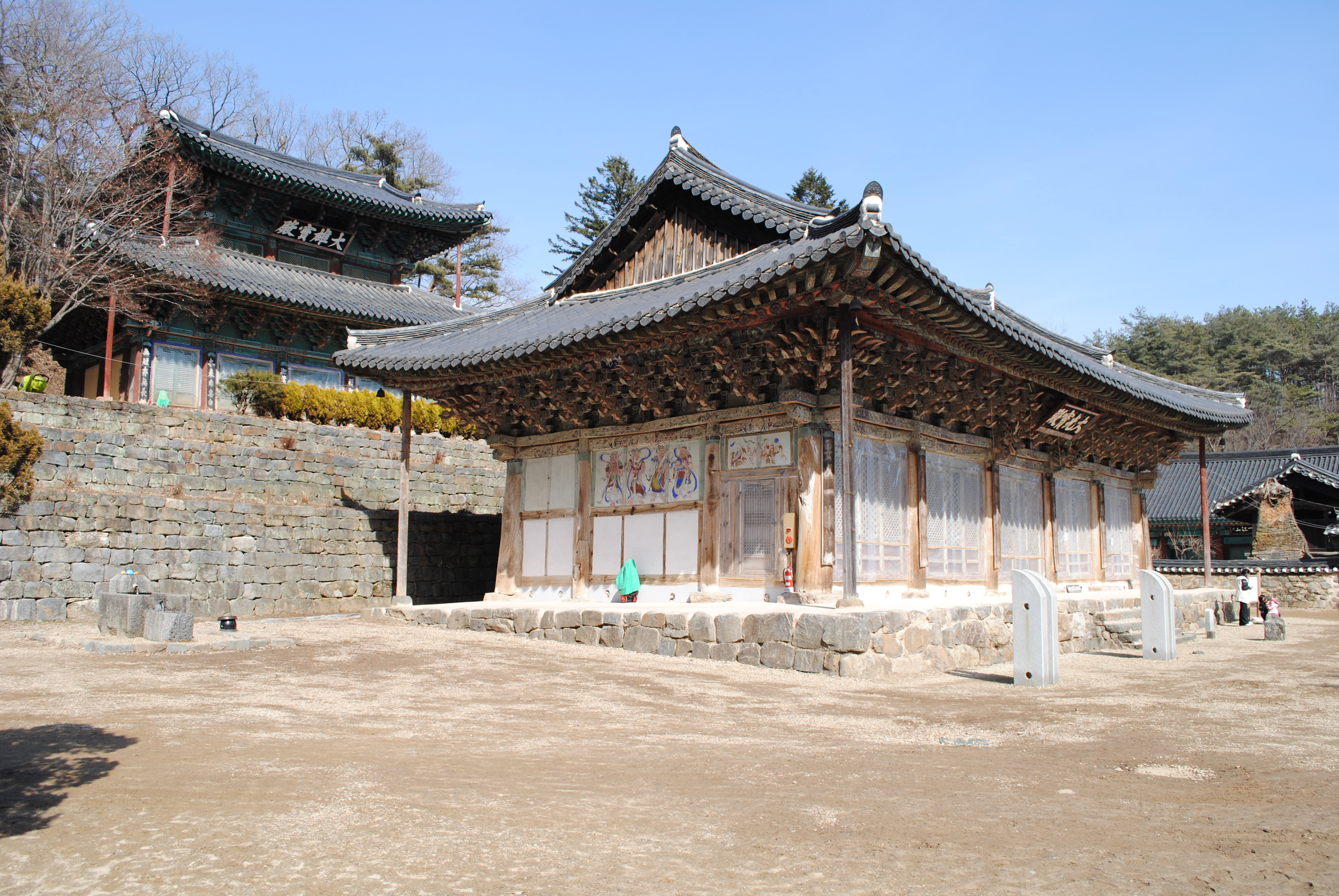

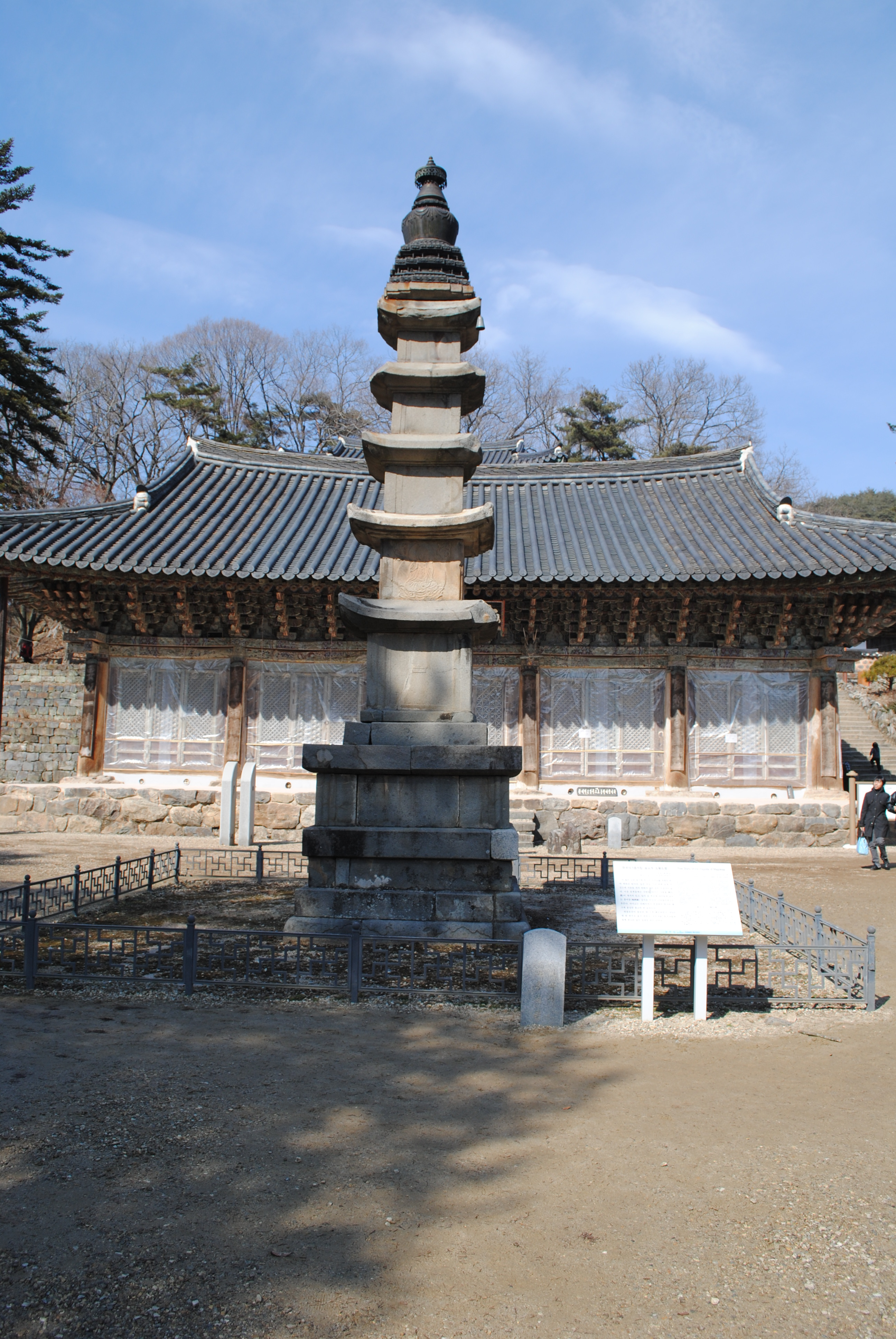

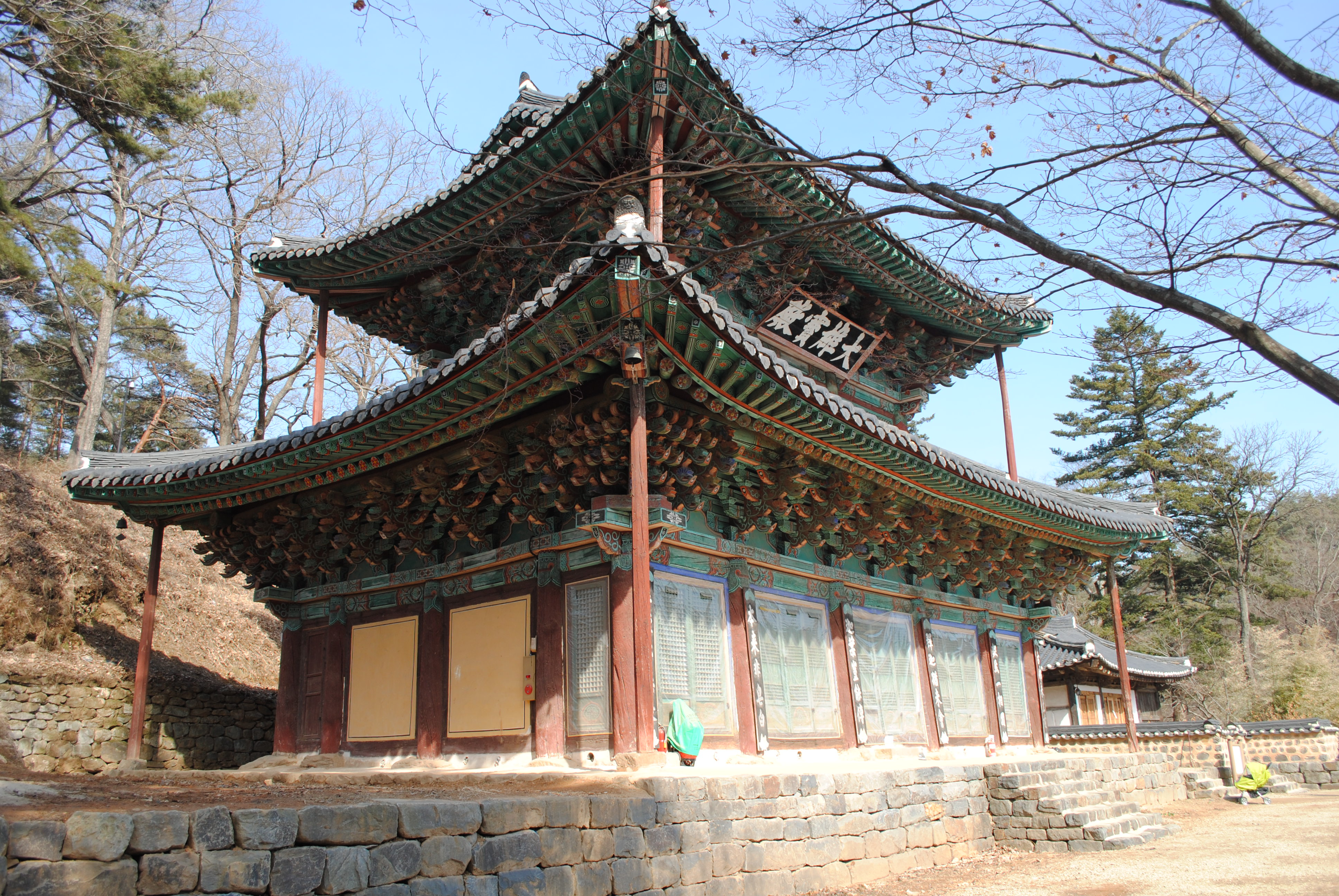

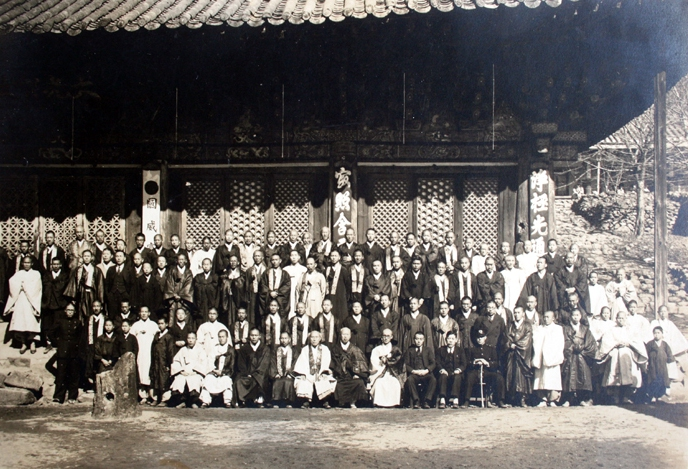

== See also ==
- Korean Buddhist temples
- Korean Buddhism
- Religion in South Korea
- Korean architecture
