= Yeongsan Shin clan =

Korean clan from South Gyeongsang Province

Yeongsan Sin clan/ Yeongwol Sin clan
- Country: Korea
- Current region: Changnyeong County
- Founder: Shin Gyeong
- Connected members: Shin Ye-eun; Shin Kuhn; Shin Dong-bin; Shin Kyuk-ho; Shin Seok Jeong; Sin Don; Sin Gyeongsuk

The Yeongsan Shin clan (Korean: 영산 신씨; Hanja: 靈山 辛氏) is one of the Korean clans. Their bon-gwan (clan location) is in Changnyeong County, South Gyeongsang Province. According to some of the most recent research as of 2015, the number of members in the Yeongsan Sin clan was 187,426.

== Origin ==
The founder of the Yeongsan Sin clan was Sin Gyeong (辛鏡) via the Xin sect (莘氏). Sin Gyeong was a descendant of Yu Shen (于莘), the son of King Qi of Xia. Hailing from the Longxi Commandery, Sin Gyeong entered Goryeo as one of the Eight Scholars (八學士) of the Northern Song dynasty. He passed the imperial examination in 1138 and was appointed as Jinzi Guanglu Daifu (金紫光祿大夫) and munha sirang pyeongjangsa (문하시랑평장사 門下侍郞平章事). Sin Gyeong settled in Yeongchwisan (靈鷲山), in Changnyeong County, where he founded the Yeongsan Sin clan.

== See also ==
- Foreign clans in Korean
