= Song Ha-choon =

- 송하춘
- Born: September 27, 1944 (age 81); Gimje
- Education: Korea University
- Occupations: Novelist and professor
- Writing career
- Language: Korean

Korean name
- Hangul: 송하춘
- Hanja: 宋河春
- RR: Song Hachun
- MR: Song Hach'un

Song Ha-choon (born September 27, 1944) is a South Korean writer, critic, and a researcher of Korean literature.

== Early life and education ==
He was born in Kimje, Jeollabukdo. He graduated from Namsung Middle School and Namsung High School in Iksan, Jeollabukdo. He entered Sungkyunkwan University but dropped out. Later he graduated from Korea University in Korean literature and received a doctorate from the same school. He then worked as a Korean literature professor at Korea University.

He began his literary career when he won the Chosun Ilbo New Writer's Contest in 1972 with "Han beon geureotge bonaen gaeul" (한 번 그렇게 보낸 가을One Autumn I Had Spent That Way).

== Writing ==
Song Ha-choon says that to him, writing fiction is a type of buffer. The world is a hopeless place, but he can use fiction to buffer the shock of such despair. As brutal and reckless as it gets, when he fights it with a clear mind, he says that it gives him strength to live on in the world. Writing gives him the strength and the abundance in mind that enables him to endure the world.

As such, his fiction also warmly looks upon those that are struggling through life. In his 1987 novel Eunjangdowa teureompet (은장도와 트럼펫 The Silver Sword and the Trumpet), he depicts the everyday enlightenments of life that happen through concrete experiences. Habaekui ttaldeul (하백의 딸들 The Daughters of Habaek), published in 1994, depicts those that struggle to live in a twisted society with a benevolent view. Literary critic Kim In-hwan has said that Song Ha-choon is "not an escapist writer who tries to oppose the world and withdraw into the inner mind, but is more of the harmonic type who trusts in the kindness of people and aims for order in the world", adding that he is a writer that writes fiction that "contains longing for harmonic life that does not violate or hurt others".

== Works ==
- Hankukgeundae soseolsajeon: 1980-1917 (한국근대 소설사전 1980-1917 The Encyclopedia of Modern Korean Fiction: 1980–1917), 2015.
- The Sphinx Does Not Know Either (스핑크스도 모른다), 2012.
- Panjeonui geulssi (판전의 글씨 The Words on the Tablet), 2006.
- Taepyeongyangeul oreuda (태평양을 오르다 Climbing the Pacific), 2004.
- Son Chang-seop (손창섭), 2003.
- Kkumkkuneun gongryong (꿈꾸는 공룡 The Dreaming Dinosaur), 1998.
- Tamguroseo-ui soseoldokbeob (탐구로서의 소설독법 Fiction Reading as Research), 1996.
- 1920 nyeondaeui hankuksoseolyeongu (1920년대 한국소설연구 Study of 1920s Korean Literature), 1995.
- Habaekui ttaldeul (하백의 딸들 The Daughters of Habaek), 1994.
- Chae Man-sik (채만식), 1994.
- 1950 nyeondaeui si-indeul (1950년대의 시인들 Poets of 1950s), 1994.
- 1950 nyeondaeui soseolgadeul (1950년대의 소설가들Fiction Writers of 1950s), 1994.
- Balgyeoneuroseo-ui soseolgibeob (발견으로서의 소설기법 Discovery as Writing Technique), 1993.
- Hobak-kkot yeoreum (호박꽃 여름 The Summer of Pumpkin Flower), 1990.
- Eunjangdowa teureompet (은장도와 트럼펫 The Silver Sword and the Trumpet), 1987.
- Hanbeon geureotge bonaen gaeul (한번 그렇게 보낸 가을 One Autumn I Had Spent That Way), 1979.

== Awards ==
- Chae Man-sik Literary Award, 2012.
- Oh Yeongsu Literary Award, 1995.
