= King An =

King An may refer to:

- King An of Zhou (died 376 BC)
- An of Samhan (died 157 BC?)

== See also ==
- An, King of Han (died 226 BC)
