= Mahan confederacy =

State in Korea, 194 BC – 6th century AD

Mahan confederacy 馬韓 마한
- 2nd century BCE–6th century CE
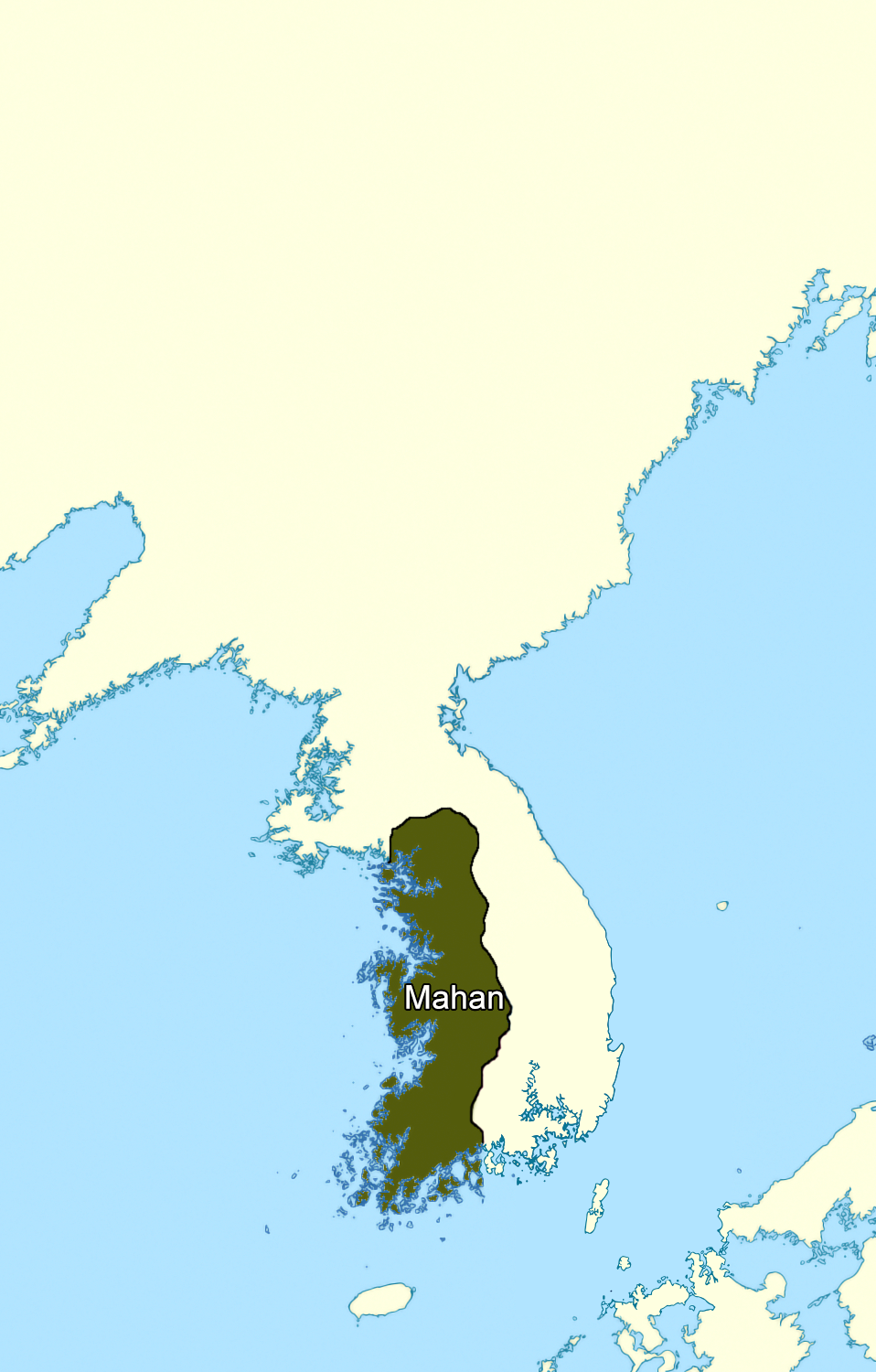
- Mahan confederacy in c. 1 CE
- Capital: Mokji
- Common languages: Han (Mahan), possibly Peninsular Japonic
- Ethnic groups: Samhan people, Yemaek, possibly Yayoi people
- Religion: Musok, possibly Koshinto
- Government: Confederacy
- Historical era: Ancient
  - Establishment: 2nd century BCE
  - Submission to Paekche: 6th century CE
Preceded by	Succeeded by
Jin (Korean state)	Paekche
- Today part of: South Korea

Korean name
- Hangul: 마한
- Hanja: 馬韓
- RR: Mahan
- MR: Mahan
- IPA: [ma.ɦan]

Mahan (Korean: 마한; Hanja: 馬韓) was a tribal grouping in southwestern Korea described in Chinese sources from the 3rd century. It was the largest of the 'three Hans' (the Samhan), along with Byeonhan and Jinhan. During the 4th century, the kingdom of Paekche rose in the territory of Mahan and became one of the Three Kingdoms of Korea.

== Etymology ==
"Mahan" (馬韓; 마한) is believed to be a combination of the Old Korean words "ma", meaning "south", and "han", meaning "big". Together, the name could possibly be interpreted as "Big Nation of the South". As part of the Samhan, Jinhan meant "Big Nation of the East" and Byeonhan meant "Big Nation of Shimmer".

== History ==
Mahan most likely developed from the existing bronze society of third to second centuries BCE of the Samhan people, while continuing to absorb migration of Yemaek people from the north in subsequent centuries. Further migration followed after the fall of Wiman Chosŏn and establishment of the Chinese commanderies in the Korean peninsula region in 108 BCE.

In the 1st century CE, the Wolji/Mokji (月支/目支) state, that formed and led Mahan confederacy, was defeated in struggles with Paekche, another member of Mahan, and consequently losing whole region of present-day Han River basin. But the San Guo Zhi recorded the Han state fallen in struggles with the Lelang Commandery and Daifang Commandery in the 246. Under continuous pressure from Paekche, only 20 statelets of Mahan confederacy survived until the late 3rd century. Paekche eventually absorbed or conquered all of Mahan by the 5th century, growing into one of the Three Kingdoms of Korea, along with Silla and Goguryeo.

=== Misconceptions ===
According to the Book of the Later Han of ancient China, King Chun of the kingdom of Kija Chosŏn (second dynasty of Old Chosŏn allegedly founded by Jizi/Kija), having lost the throne to Wiman, fled to the state of Jin in southern Korea around 194–180 BCE. Following this story, King Chun and his followers are thought to have established a base within the previous Jin territory and founded a polity.

However, it is unclear whether Mahan is related to this polity due to the lack of archaeological evidence found in Korea and the nature of the source being of foreign (Chinese) origin. In addition, the same book claims that King Chun was Jizi (Kija)'s descendant whereas no Korean sources allude to such genealogy, hence the existence of such controversy.

Currently, historians from both Koreas (North and South) suspect an attempt of sinicization (similar to Jinhan with Qin dynasty; see Jinhan confederacy's misconceptions) and reject the existence of Jizi (Kija) and Kija Chosŏn within history of Korea, thus in turn, rejecting the claims found in the same source, the Book of the Later Han. The general consensus is that there were only two Chosŏn dynasties: the earliest native Old Chosŏn, and Wiman Chosŏn after Wiman (Weiman) fled to Korea, assimilated, and replaced the previous dynasty with his own until he was defeated by the Han dynasty and the Four Commanderies of Han were formed.

== Politics ==
Kings of Mahan occasionally called themselves "King of Jin," referring to the earlier Jin state and asserting nominal sovereignty over all of Samhan. A wealth of bronze artifacts and production facilities indicate that Mahan was probably the earliest developed of the three Hans. At its height, Mahan covered much of the Han River Basin and the modern-day provinces of Gyeonggi, Chungcheong, and Jeolla, although political unity was strongest led by Mokji state (목지국, 目支國) in Cheonan, Chungcheong.

== Culture ==
"There are three stocks: the first is called Mahan, the second Jinhan, and the third Byeonhan, which is the ancient state of Jin. Mahan is to the west of it. Its people are settled on the land and both sow and plant... Scattered between the mountains and the sea, their settlements have no inner or outer walls... By custom they have few rules and regulations. Their national town has a dominant leader, but the people's settlements are scattered, and they are not readily subject to regulation and control. They do not have the ceremony of kneeling to make obeisance. For their dwellings they make grass-roofed earth-chambers shaped like tumuli; the door is on the top, and a whole family lives together inside, with no distinction as to old or young, male or female... They do not know about riding oxen and horses, their oxen and horses being used exclusively for accompanying the dead... They are strong and brave by nature. They wear the "tadpole knot" and leave it bare like a shining fishtail. They wear gowns of rough cloth, and on their feet they wear leather sandals. When there is something to be done within their community up to the point where the authorities have walls built, all the young braves and stalwarts gouge out the skin of their backs to string themselves together with a large rope, or, again, they insert through their shin wooden poles about a zhang in length. They then chant all day as they work, not because they consider the work painful, but to give themselves encouragement; moreover they consider this to be stalwart behavior... They have a fondness for brigandage... Among their men one occasionally sees one who is tattooed. Moreover on the large islands in the sea west of Mahan there are outlanders, very short and small people whose language is not the same as that of the Han. They all bind their hair like Xianbei, but they make their clothing of leather and like to raise oxen and pigs. Their clothing has an upper part, but no lower part, and indeed it is almost as if they were naked. They go back and forth by boat, buying and selling in the Han."

— Records of the Three Kingdoms

== Legacy ==
Goryeo historians identified Mahan with Goguryeo, which was supported by their works like Samguk sagi, Samguk yusa and Chewang un'gi. That historical view was previously given by Ch'oe Ch'iwŏn, a noted Confucian scholar and historian in the late Silla period. Apart from the geographical location of Mahan, the Chinese historical record History of Song defines the ethnical origin of the Chŏngan kingdom, a successor state of Parhae, as Mahan.

In the late Joseon period, that historical notion came under criticism by early Silhak scholar Han Baek-gyeom, who emphasized the linkage between Mahan and Paekche in terms of the geographical location.

== Monarchs of Mahan confederacy ==
Mahan was an ancient Korean confederacy established after the fall of Jin. The following list is based on the records of the Cheongju Han clan.

#	Westernized	Hanja/Hangul	Period of reign
1	King Jun	箕準（기준）	220–193BCE
2	King Gang	康王（강왕）	193–189BCE
3	King An	箕龕（기감）	189–157BCE
4	King Hye	箕寔（기식）	157–144BCE
5	King Myung	箕武（기무）	144–113BCE
6	King Hyo	箕亨（기형）	113–73BCE
7	King Yang	箕燮（기섭）	73–58BCE
8	King Won	箕勳（기훈）	58–33BCE
9	King Gye	箕貞（기정）	33–17BCE

== Statelets ==
According to the San Guo Zhi, Mahan consisted of 54 statelets of up to ten thousand families each:

- Gamhae (감해국, 感奚國), present-day Iksan.
- Gamhaebiri (감해비리국, 監奚卑離國), present-day Hongseong.
- Geonma (건마국, 乾馬國), present-day Iksan.
- Gorap (고랍국, 古臘國), present-day Namwon.
- Gori (고리국, 古離國), present-day Iksan.
- Gobiri (고비리국, 古卑離國), present-day Yangpyeong or Yeoju.
- Gowon (고원국, 古爰國)
- Gotanja (고탄자국, 古誕者國)
- Gopo (고포국, 古蒲國), present-day Buyeo County.
- Guro (구로국, 狗盧國), present-day Cheongyang.
- Gusaodan (구사오단국, 臼斯烏旦國), present-day Jangseong.
- Guso (구소국, 狗素國), present-day Jeongeup.
- Guhae (구해국, 狗奚國), present-day Gangjin.
- Naebiri (내비리국, 內卑離國)
- Noram (노람국, 怒藍國)
- Daeseoksak (대석삭국, 大石索國), present-day Yangju or Ganghwa Island.
- Mangno (막로국, 莫盧國)
- Mallo (만로국, 萬盧國), present-day Boryeong or Gunsan.
- Morobiri (모로비리국, 牟盧卑離國), present-day Gochang.
- Mosu (모수국, 牟水國), present-day Suwon.
- Mokji (목지국, 目支國), present-day Cheonan.
- Paekche (백제국, 百濟國), present-day Seoul.
- Byeokbiri (벽비리국, 辟卑離國), present-day Gimje.
- Bulmi (불미국, 不彌國), present-day Naju.
- Bulsabunsa (불사분사국, 不斯濆邪國), present-day Jeonju.
- Burun (불운국, 不雲國), present-day Gongju or Boseong.
- Biri (비리국, 卑離國), present-day Gunsan.
- Bimi (비미국, 卑彌國), present-day Seocheon.
- Saro (사로국, 駟盧國), present-day Hongseong.
- Sangoe (상외국, 桑外國), present-day Hwaseong.
- Soseoksak (소석삭국, 小石索國), present-day Gyodong Island.
- Sowigeon (소위건국, 素謂乾國), present-day Boryeong.
- Songnobulsa (속로불사국, 速盧不斯國), present-day Gimpo.
- Sinbunhwal (신분활국, 臣濆活國), present-day Anseong or Gapyeong.
- Sinsodo (신소도국, 臣蘇塗國), present-day Taean.
- Sinunsin (신운신국, 臣雲新國), present-day Cheonan.
- Sinheun (신흔국, 臣釁國), present-day Daejeon or Asan.
- Arim (아림국, 兒林國), present-day Seocheon or Yesan.
- Yeoraebiri (여래비리국, 如來卑離國), present-day Iksan.
- Yeomno (염로국, 冉路國), present-day Asan.
- Uhyumotak (우휴모탁국, 優休牟涿國), present-day Bucheon.
- Wonyang (원양국, 爰襄國), present-day Hwaseong or Paju.
- Wonji (원지국, 爰池國), present-day Yeosu.
- Illan (일난국, 一難國)
- Illi (일리국, 一離國)
- Irhwa (일화국, 日華國)
- Imsoban (임소반국, 臨素半國), present-day Gunsan.
- Jarimoro (자리모로국, 咨離牟盧國), present-day Icheon.
- Jiban (지반국, 支半國), present-day Buan.
- Jichim (지침국, 支侵國), present-day Eumseong.
- Cheomno (첩로국, 捷盧國), present-day Jeongeup.
- Chori (초리국, 楚離國), present-day Goheung.
- Chosandobiri (초산도비리국, 楚山塗卑離國), present-day Jindo County.
- Chiriguk (치리국국, 致利鞠國), present-day Seocheon.

== See also ==
- History of Korea
