= Yang of Samhan =

Mahan king

- Hangul: 양왕
- Hanja: 襄王
- Revised Romanization: Hyo Wang
- McCune–Reischauer: Hyo Wang

King Yang (Korean: 기섭; Hanja: 箕燮) was the 7th king of Mahan confederacy. He reigned from 73 BCE to 58 BCE. His true name was Hyo (Korean: 섭; Hanja: 燮). He was succeeded by Won of Samhan (Won Wang).

== See also ==
- List of Korean monarchs
- History of Korea

Yang of Samhan Mahan confederacy Died: 58 BC
Regnal titles
Preceded by King Hyo	King of Mahan confederacy 73 BC–58 BC	Succeeded by King Won
