= Myung of Samhan =

5th king of Mahan confederacy

- Hangul: 명왕
- Hanja: 明王
- Revised Romanization: Myung Wang
- McCune–Reischauer: Myung Wang

King Myung (Korean: 기무; Hanja: 箕武) was the 5th king of Mahan confederacy. He reigned from 144 BCE to 113 BCE. His true name was Myung (무; 武). He was succeeded by Hyo of Samhan (Hyo Wang).

== See also ==
- List of Korean monarchs
- History of Korea

Myung of Samhan Mahan confederacy Died: 113 BC
Regnal titles
Preceded by King Hye	King of Mahan confederacy 144 BC–113 BC	Succeeded by King Hyo
