= Hyo of Samhan =

- Hangul: 효왕
- Hanja: 孝王
- Revised Romanization: Hyo Wang
- McCune–Reischauer: Hyo Wang

King Hyo (Korean: 기형; Hanja: 箕亨) was the 6th king of Mahan confederacy. He reigned from 113 BCE to 73 BCE. His true name was Hyo (Korean: 형; Hanja: 亨). He was succeeded by Yang of Samhan (Yang Wang).

== See also ==
- List of Korean monarchs
- History of Korea

Hyo of Samhan Mahan confederacy Died: 73 BC
Regnal titles
Preceded by King Myung	King of Mahan confederacy 113 BC–73 BC	Succeeded by King Yang
