= Buan County =

Coordinates: 35°43′41″N 126°43′55″E

Buan
- County
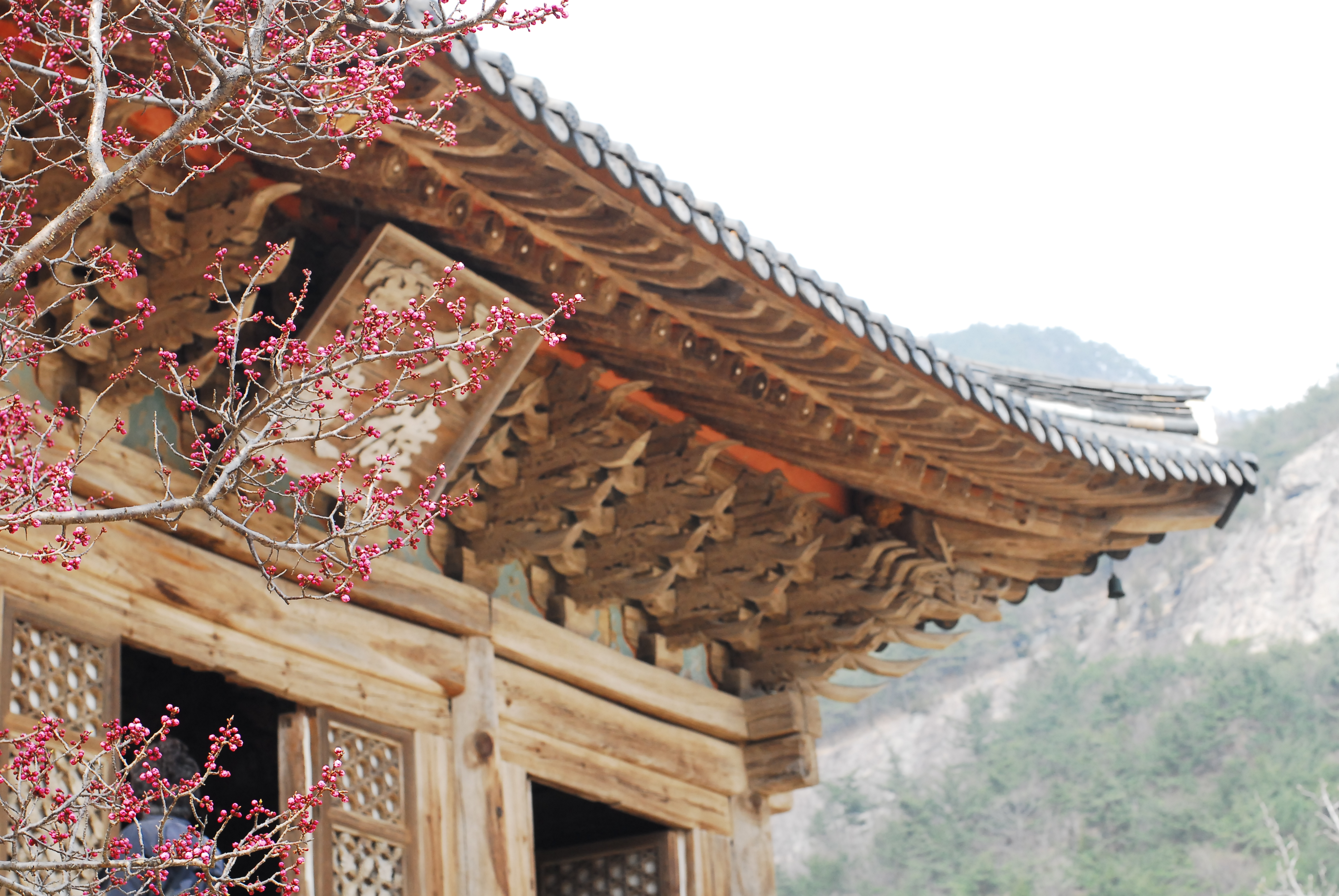
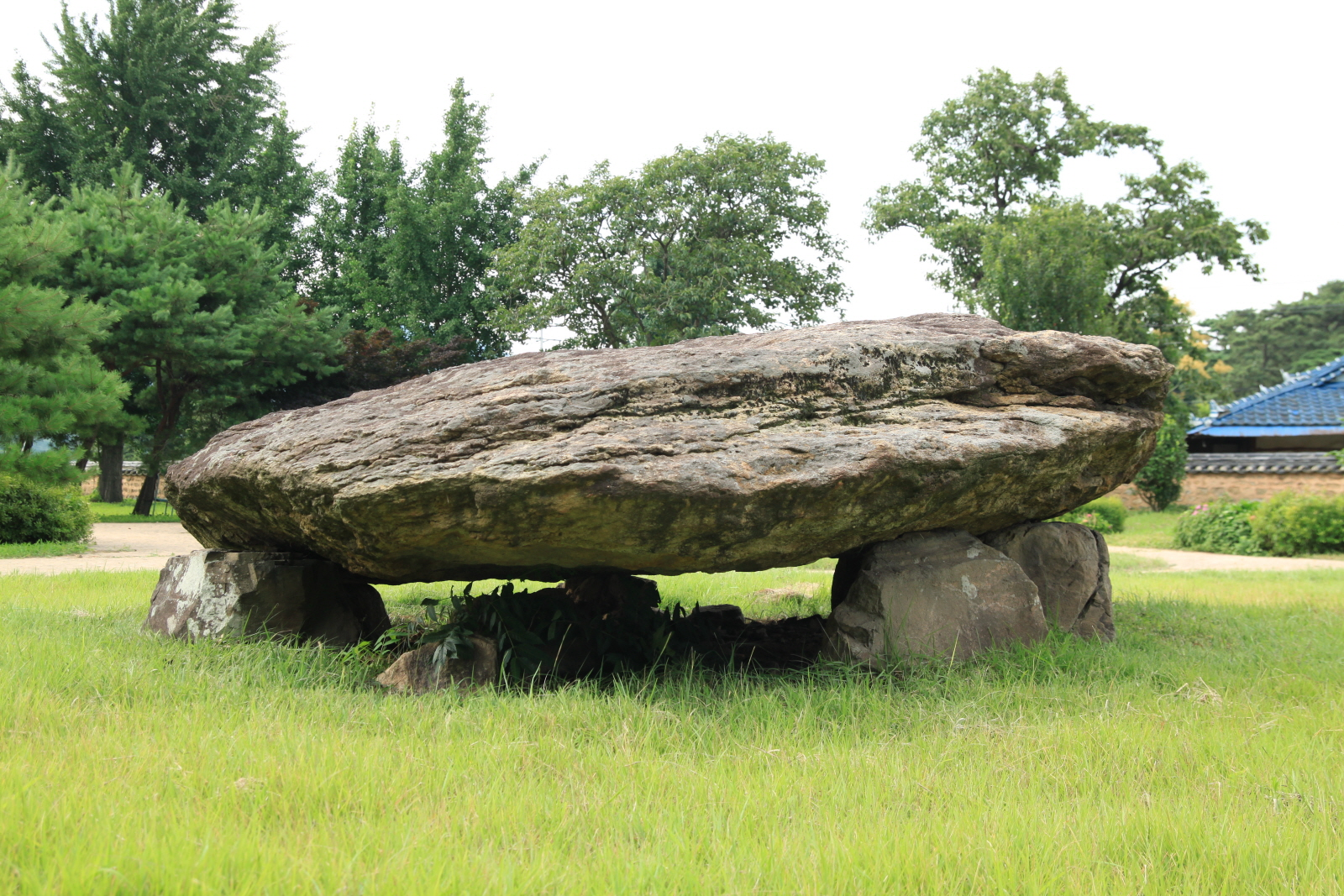
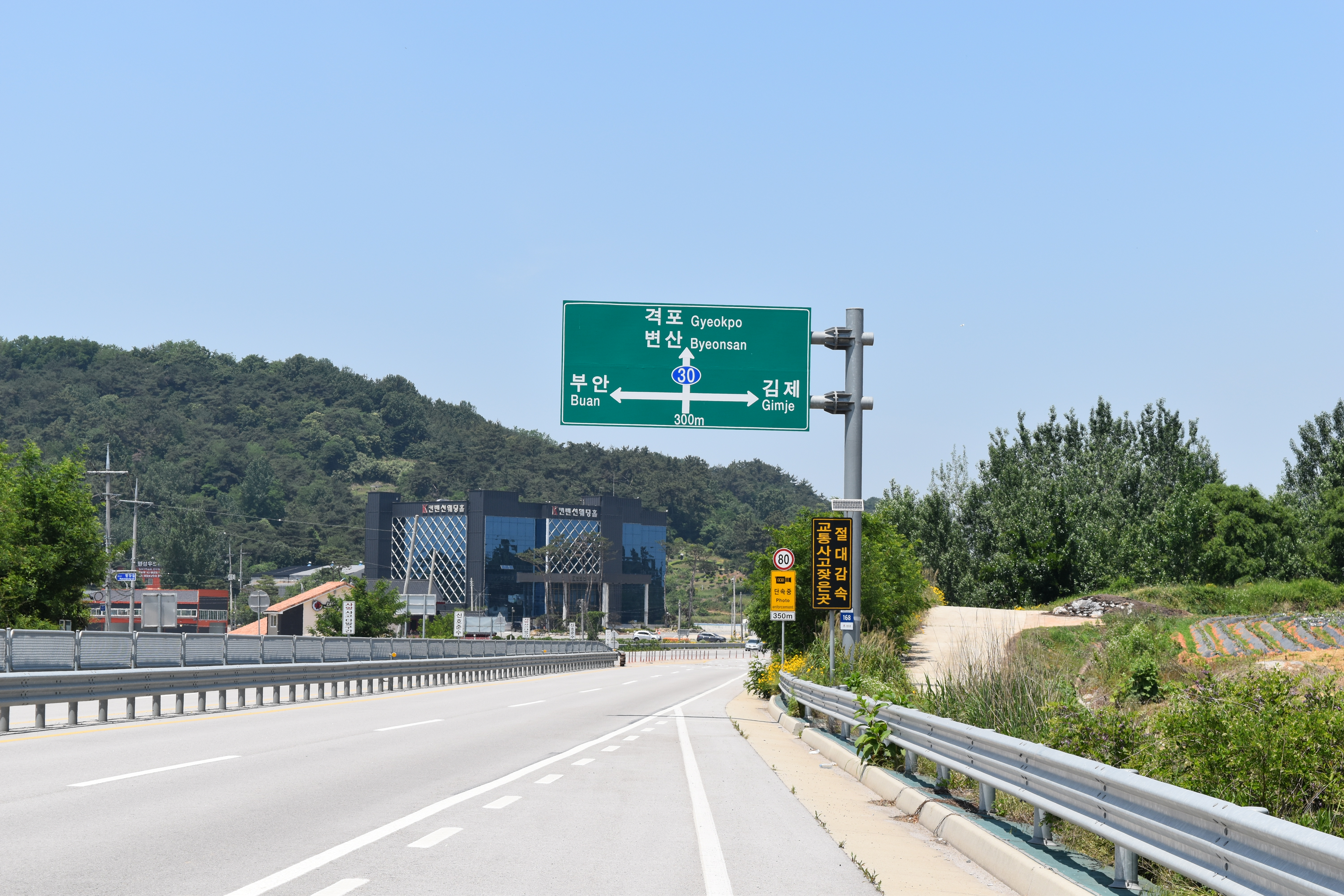
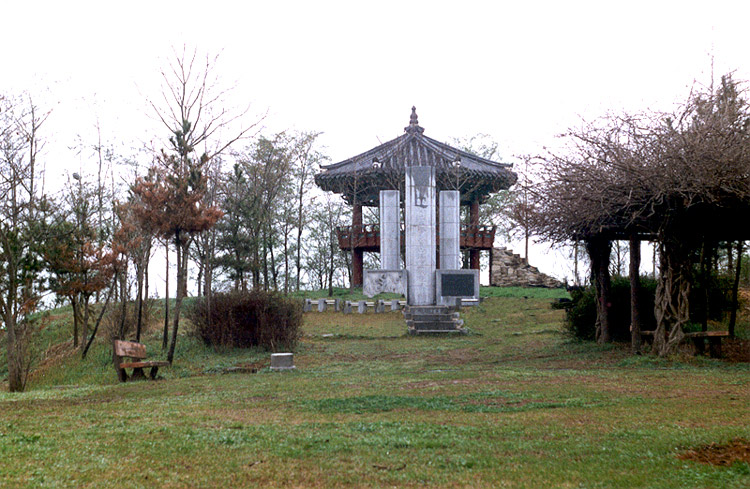
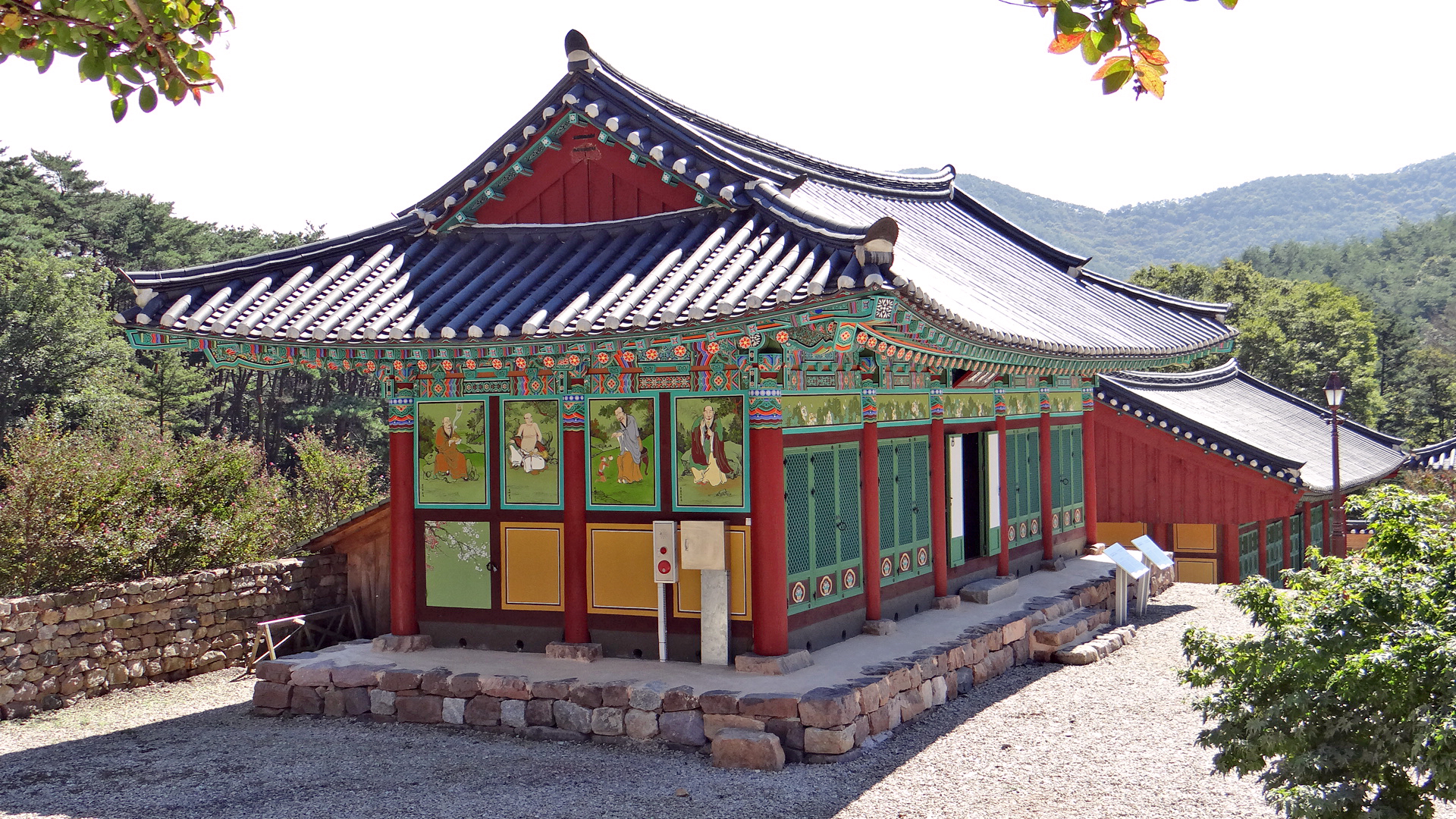
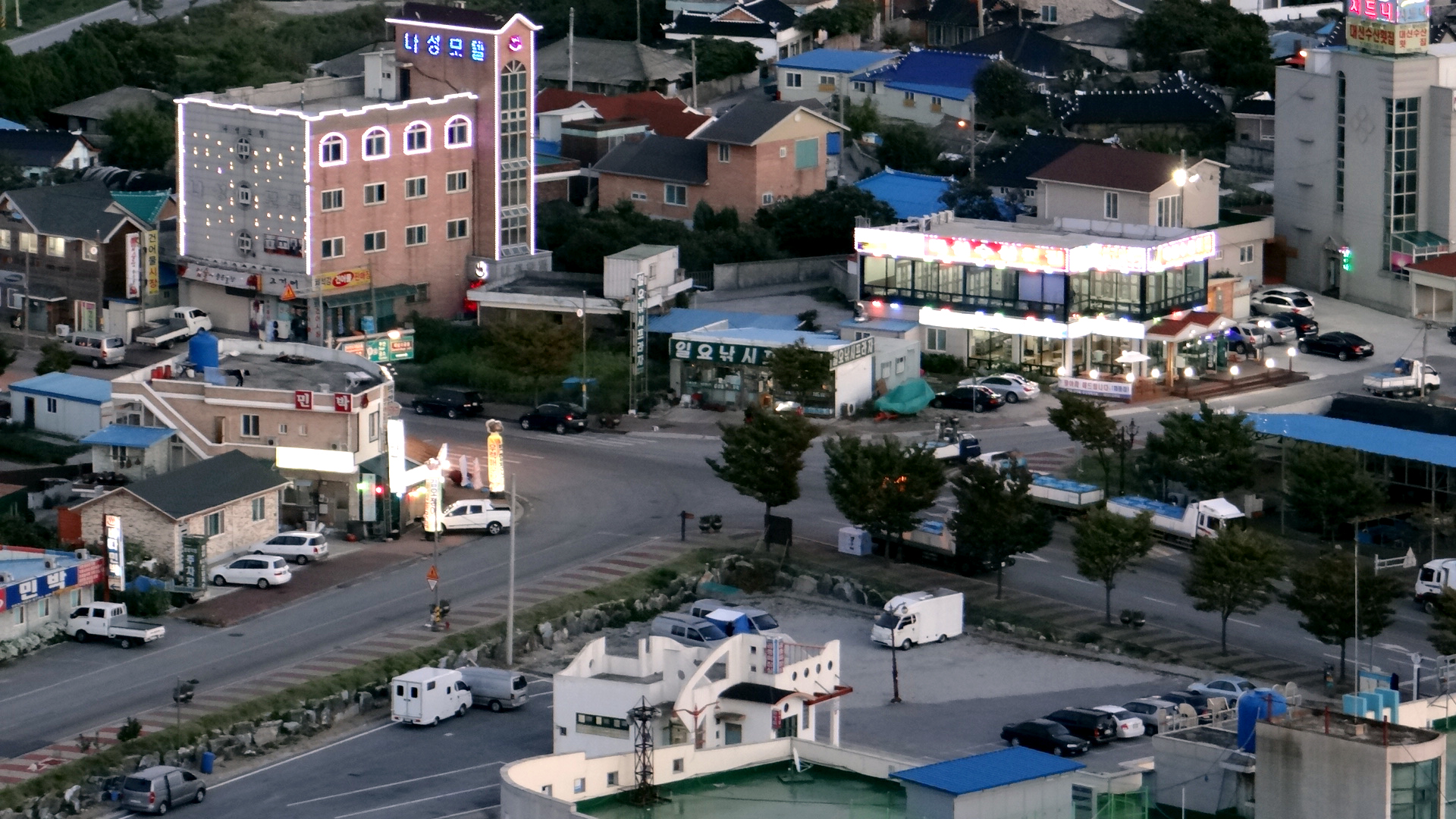
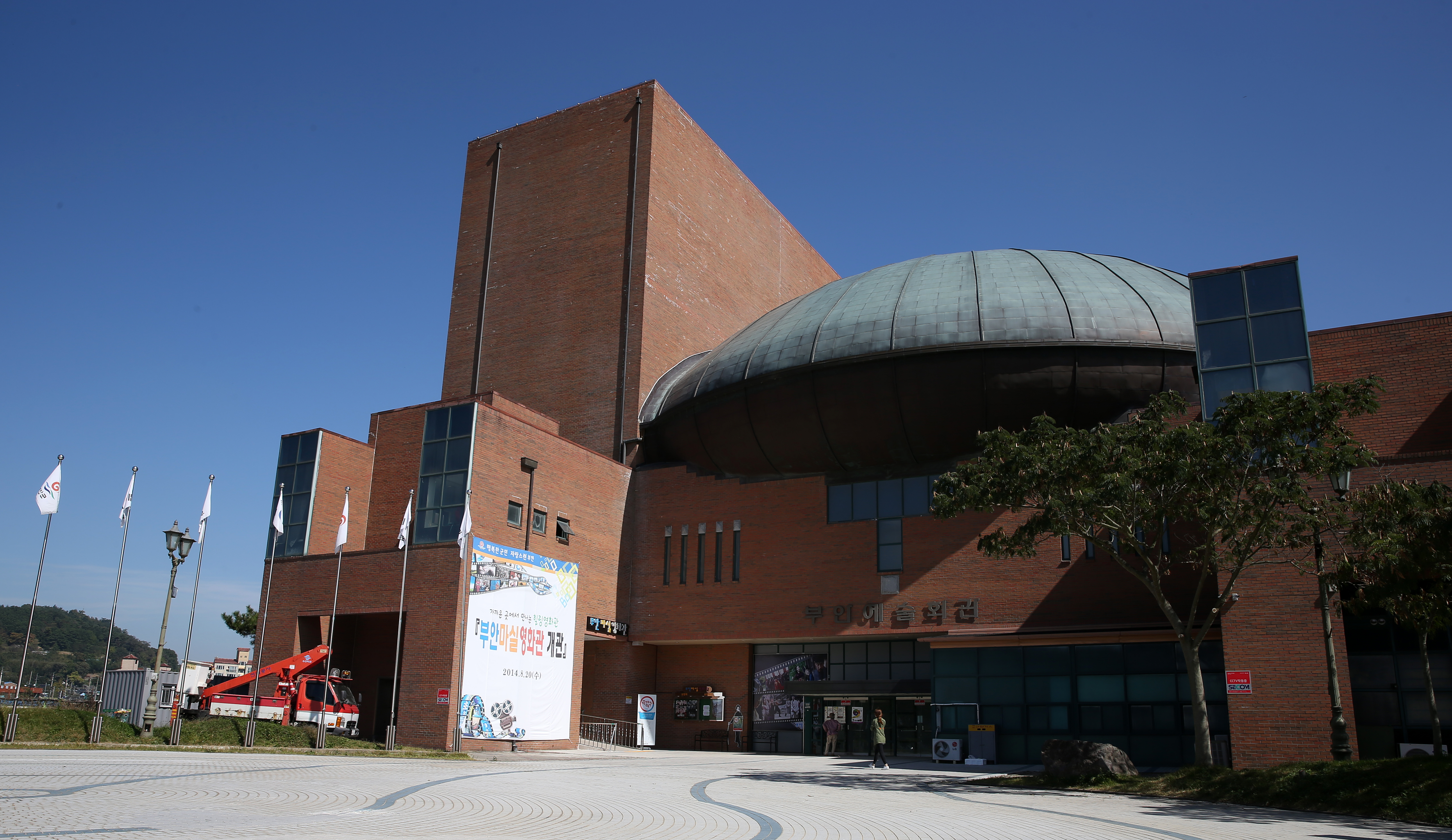
- From the left: Naesosa, Dolmens, National Route 30, Baeksansung, Gaemsa, Gyeokpo Port, Buan Arts Center

- Flag Emblem of Buan

- Location in South Korea
- Country: South Korea
- State: Jeonbuk
- Administrative divisions: 1 eup, 12 myeon

Area
  - Total: 493.35 km^{2} (190.48 sq mi)

Population (December 2024)
  - Total: 48,066
  - Density: 97/km^{2} (250/sq mi)
  - Dialect: Jeolla
- Website: http://www.buan.go.kr/(Korean) http://www.buan.go.kr/eng/index.buan

Korean name
- Hangul: 부안군
- Hanja: 扶安郡
- RR: Buan-gun
- MR: Puan-gun

Buan County (Korean: 부안군) is a county in Jeonbuk State, South Korea. It is bounded by the city of Jeongeup on the east, the county of Gochang on the south, the city of Gimje on the north, and Yellow Sea on the west. Buan is divided into 1 eup, 12 myeon, and 510 ri. Buan had a 2001 estimated population of 74,716 people and a 2018 population of 54,441 people with an area of 493.35 km^{2}. Famous people from Buan include Joseon Dynasty kisaeng and poet, Yi Mae-chang. Like many rural areas in southern Korea, it has seen shrinking population with many younger people moving north to larger cities such as Seoul. This county should not be confused with Muan, the new capital of South Jeolla Province.

== History ==
=== Proto–Three Kingdoms period ===
During the Samhan Period Buan County was called Mahan, and it was also called Jiban statelets among the 54 Mahan statelets.

=== Three Kingdoms period ===
During the Beakjae Period, there were two small localities: Gaehwa and Heunlyangmae. In B.C 757 (16th year of King Gyeongdeok's regime), after Silla united the three kingdoms, Gyehwa was renamed as Buryeong (sometimes called Gyebal) and was a part of Gobu. Honliang was renamed as Hee-an and was also a part of Gobu.

=== Goryeo ===
During the Goryeo period, the county was called Boan-hyeon and was also nicknamed as Namju. In late Goryeo, during King U's regime, there were local governors were posted to Buryeong-hyeon and Boan-hyeon.

=== Joseon ===
During the 14th and 16th years of King Taejong's reign, the two localities Buryeong-hyeon and Boan-hyeon were merged and separated several times. In December 1416, the two localities were merged and named Buan, the "bu" coming from Buryeong and the "an" coming from Boan. The following year a locality named Heungdeokjin was made a part of Buan and was renamed as Buanjin. A high-level civil servant named the Byeongmasa ruled over the county. In 1423 (5th year of King Sejong's regime), the ruler was changed from Cheomjeoljesa to Hyeongam. Locality Buan was changed into Boan County in 1895 (32nd year of King Gojong's regime), when several different terms representing localities (bu, mok, gun, and hyeon) were unified to a single term - gun(county). In 1914, during the Japanese occupation, the administrative district was changed: Wido became a part of Yeonggwang County(South Jeolla Province), and Biando was annexed to Gunsan City. Baeksan, Geoma, and Deoklim of Gobu County were annexed to Buan County.

In 1943, Byreong-myeon was upgraded into Buan-eup.

=== Today ===
On January 1, 1963, According to changes in the administrative districts, Wido-myeon of Yeonggwang County (South Jeolla Province) was annexed to Buan County.

With the reclamation works of Gaehwado in 1978, the country's territory was increased by 3,968ha. In 1983 Sannae-myeon and Jinseo-myeon were divided into Gawhwa-myeon and Jinso-myeon. Currently, the administrative district consists of 1 eup and 12 myeon. The total area is 493 km^{2} (farming land 42%, forest land 42%, other 16%). Buan county is located and longitude 126 degrees 40 minutes, latitude 35 degrees 40 minutes. It is located to the west of Jeonbuk State and its border meets with Gunsan City at the sea. To the north is Gimje City, to the southeast is Jeongeup City, and to the south there is Gochang County. The land is low in the east side and high on the west site. The peninsula sticks out into the Yellow Sea. To the southwest, a mountain named Byeonsan stands in layers. To the northeast there are wide and rich fields. The coast runs from the mouth of the Dongjingang River to Julpo-myeon Upo-ri, is 66 km long. The sea winds bring about a lot of snow in the winter.

== Climate ==
Climate data for Buan (1991–2020 normals, extremes 1969–present)
Month	Jan	Feb	Mar	Apr	May	Jun	Jul	Aug	Sep	Oct	Nov	Dec	Year
Record high °C (°F)	18.6 (65.5)	21.5 (70.7)	26.3 (79.3)	30.9 (87.6)	32.7 (90.9)	34.3 (93.7)	37.2 (99.0)	38.0 (100.4)	34.3 (93.7)	30.7 (87.3)	26.8 (80.2)	18.9 (66.0)	38.0 (100.4)
Mean daily maximum °C (°F)	4.5 (40.1)	6.7 (44.1)	11.8 (53.2)	17.9 (64.2)	23.2 (73.8)	26.6 (79.9)	29.7 (85.5)	30.6 (87.1)	26.6 (79.9)	21.1 (70.0)	14.1 (57.4)	7.0 (44.6)	18.3 (64.9)
Daily mean °C (°F)	−0.2 (31.6)	1.6 (34.9)	5.9 (42.6)	11.5 (52.7)	17.1 (62.8)	21.5 (70.7)	25.3 (77.5)	25.9 (78.6)	21.2 (70.2)	14.9 (58.8)	8.5 (47.3)	2.1 (35.8)	12.9 (55.2)
Mean daily minimum °C (°F)	−4.5 (23.9)	−2.9 (26.8)	0.7 (33.3)	6.0 (42.8)	12.0 (53.6)	17.6 (63.7)	22.0 (71.6)	22.3 (72.1)	16.7 (62.1)	9.4 (48.9)	3.5 (38.3)	−2.4 (27.7)	8.4 (47.1)
Record low °C (°F)	−22.6 (−8.7)	−18.7 (−1.7)	−10.2 (13.6)	−3.6 (25.5)	2.5 (36.5)	7.7 (45.9)	13.8 (56.8)	12.5 (54.5)	4.9 (40.8)	−2.2 (28.0)	−9.8 (14.4)	−20.2 (−4.4)	−22.6 (−8.7)
Average precipitation mm (inches)	31.7 (1.25)	36.4 (1.43)	47.3 (1.86)	80.0 (3.15)	84.9 (3.34)	131.8 (5.19)	275.5 (10.85)	260.3 (10.25)	139.4 (5.49)	56.0 (2.20)	52.3 (2.06)	42.4 (1.67)	1,238 (48.74)
Average precipitation days (≥ 0.1 mm)	9.9	7.1	7.7	8.0	7.9	8.8	14.0	12.7	8.3	6.5	8.5	10.7	110.1
Average snowy days	8.8	5.9	1.6	0.1	0.0	0.0	0.0	0.0	0.0	0.1	2.2	6.6	25.2
Average relative humidity (%)	74.3	70.9	68.9	67.9	70.4	75.8	80.4	79.0	76.8	73.0	71.9	74.2	73.6
Mean monthly sunshine hours	150.2	167.5	210.5	225.9	241.0	198.4	172.1	200.2	196.3	202.7	156.5	138.3	2,259.6
Percentage possible sunshine	53.0	58.2	58.6	61.2	58.2	50.2	45.9	54.4	58.0	64.0	54.8	50.7	55.6
Source: Korea Meteorological Administration (snow and percent sunshine 1981–2010)

== Administrative district ==
The administrative district of Buan-gun consists of 1 eup and 12 myeon. The area of Buan-gun is 493.35 km^{2}, and the population is 48,066 people and 27,434 households as of resident registration at the end of December 2024. 38% of the county's total residents live in Buan-eup. Rocks from the Precambrian period are distributed only to a small extent, granites form the plains of eastern Buan-gun, and Cretaceous volcanic rocks form the geology of the Byeonsan Peninsula area in western Buan-gun.

== Geology ==
Buan-gun is located at the southwest end of the boundary between the Gyeonggi massif and the Okcheon fold belt.

Its geology is composed of gneiss formed in the Precambrian period, granite intruded in the Jurassic period of the Mesozoic Era, and volcanic rocks from the Cretaceous period of the Mesozoic Era occupying the Byeonsan Peninsula area. In the Sinsongrim Village area of Jangsin-ri, the biotite gneiss shows a folded pattern. In this area, biotite gneiss is intruded by Jurassic porphyllite granite (Jpgr), biotite granite (Jbgr), and Cretaceous Baekryeon-ri rhyolite (Kbbr), and is in contact with the Cretaceous Jangsinri Formation (Kj) to the west of Jangsin-ri through a fault. Along the northern forest road of Seokbulsan Mountain between Jangsin-ri and Uibok-ri, Gyehwa-myeon, small-scale biotite gneiss is captured within a porphyritic granite body.

=== Precambrian ===
- Precambrian gneisses are distributed on a small scale in the following areas. Biotite gneiss (PPrbgn), formed in the Precambrian Paleozoic Era, is developed in the southeastern part of Jangsin-ri and Cheongho-ri, Haseo-myeon, Buan-gun, and is the oldest rock in the Buan region. As a result of analyzing zircons from other rocks that intruded into the same rock in the Iksan area, an age of about 1.8 billion years was found, and the geological age of this rock appears to be the Paleozoic Era.
- Fresh outcrops of Precambrian gneiss and schist are well exposed along the northern coast of Gyeokpo Port in Gyeokpo-ri, Byeonsan-myeon. Gneiss is a metamorphic rock that results from the injection of white granitic materials into orthogneiss, which is a metamorphic type of granite, and schist of heterogeneous, silty, and sandy elements. Sub-gneisses that have undergone migmatization and granitization are mixed. The main constituent minerals of gneiss vary in relative amount depending on the type of source rock, but are primarily composed of quartz, orthoclase, siltstone, plagioclase, biotite, and muscovite.
- In the eastern area of Nampo-ri and Udong-ri, Boan-myeon (the area between Mangwolbong and Gamtubong Peak), Paleozoic gneiss is distributed in small quantities. On the eastern side of the gneiss distribution area, the Cheonmasan tuff of Buan volcanic rock lies unconformably, and on the western part, fractured breccias are partially distributed, and the Seokpo tuff and Udongjae tuff are in direct contact with the gneiss through a fault relationship.

=== Paleozoic Ordovician ===
- In uninhabited island areas such as Large Island, Small Island, Imsu Island, and Saengdannyeo in Wido-myeon, Buan-gun, foliated tonalite (Oft) is distributed as an independent rock body, and access to the outcrop is very limited to directly observe the rock. The 206Pb/238U age for zircon is 451.6±4.7 Ma, indicating a formation period in the late Ordovician (Katian).

=== Mesozoic Jurassic granite ===
The granite that is widely distributed in the eastern part of Buan-gun, forming a plain area, is a part of the Daebo granite body that is widely distributed in the areas of Iksan, Gimje, Jeongeup, and Gochang in the Honam region. In general, granites intruded during the Mesozoic Era are distributed in the northwest area of Seokbulsan Mountain in Haseo-myeon, almost all areas of Dongjin-myeon, Haengan-myeon, Buan-eup, Baeksan-myeon, Jusan-myeon, and Julpo-myeon, and the eastern part of Boan-myeon.

== Transport ==
Buan Bus Terminal provides direct services to Seoul, Daejeon and Gwangju, as well as services within Jeonbuk State to Jeonju, Gimje, Iksan, Gunsan, Jeongeup and Gochang. The nearest railway station is at Gimje on the Honam Line.

=== Major roads ===
- National Route 30
- National Route 23
- Seohaean Expressway

== Notable places ==
Eight Scenic Views of Byeonsan

- WoongYeonJoDae
- Jigso Waterfall
- SoSaMoJong
- WolMyeongMooAe
- SeoHaeNakJo (Glow of the Setting Sun on the West Sea)
- ChaeSeokBeomJu
- JiPoSinGyeong
- GaeAmGoJeok

Museum

- New & Renewable Energy Village
- Seokjeong Literary Museum
- Hwimok Art Museum

Temple

- Naeso Temple
- Gaeam Temple

== Sister Cities ==
Twinned :

- Ansan, South Korea
- Goyang, South Korea
- Gwangmyeong, South Korea
- Suyeong District, South Korea
- Jung District, Busan, South Korea
- Pohang, South Korea
- Chungju, South Korea
- Gyeyang District, South Korea
- Honghu, China

Friendship :

- Seoul, South Korea
- Dobong District, South Korea
- Dongdaemun District, South Korea
- Ankang, China

== See also ==
- Geography of South Korea
