= Gye of Samhan =

1st century BCE Mahan king

- Hangul: 계왕
- Hanja: 稽王
- Revised Romanization: Gye Wang
- McCune–Reischauer: Kye Wang

King Gye (Korean: 기정; Hanja: 箕貞) was the 9th king of Mahan confederacy. He reigned from 33 BCE to 17 BCE. His true name was Gye (Korean: 정; Hanja: 貞).

== See also ==
- List of Korean monarchs
- History of Korea

Gye of Samhan Mahan confederacy Died: 17 BC
Regnal titles
| Preceded by King Won | King of Mahan confederacy 33 BC–17 BC | Succeeded by |
