= Sin Chang-won =

South Korean criminal (born 1967)

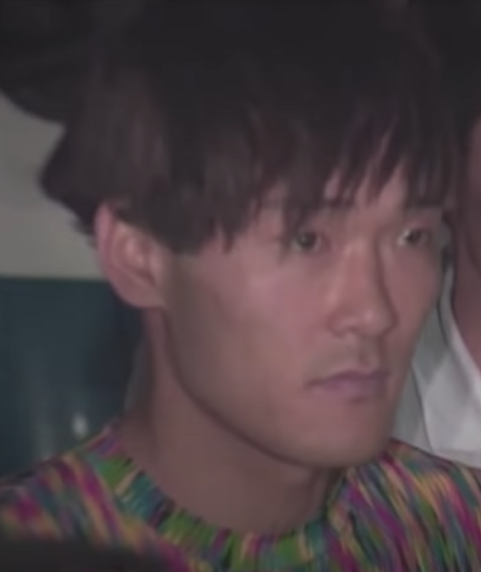

Korean name
- Hangul: 신창원
- Hanja: 申昌源
- RR: Sin Changwon
- MR: Sin Ch'angwŏn

Sin Chang-won (born May 28, 1967) is a South Korean criminal who gained notoriety after escaping from prison in 1997 and evading police for over two years. Despite a nationwide manhunt, he narrowly avoided arrest on many occasions. While some dubbed him a "Robin Hood" or "Hong Gil-dong" (a Korean fictional hero) for his donation of a part of his proceeds to the needy and his ability to evade his pursuers, Korean authorities objected to this characterization, and noted that it originated in the overseas press. Regardless, his story attracted wide public fascination and sympathy, and he even inspired a fad for the colorful Missoni T-shirt that he was wearing when he was finally captured.

== Early life ==
Sin Chang-won was born in Gimje City, North Jeolla Province, South Korea, on May 28, 1967. His father Sin Hong-seon (신흥선) was a poor farmer, and he had one sister, two older brothers, and one younger brother. Sin's mother died of liver cancer while he was in elementary school. He completed elementary school, and attended middle school but did not graduate. He later earned a middle school diploma by state examination while in prison.

Sin was first arrested and sent to juvenile detention at the age of 15, in July 1982, when his father turned him in to the police for the theft of a watermelon. He was subsequently arrested three times for theft, once for battery, and once for leaving the scene of a traffic accident. In September 1989 he was given a life sentence for his role in an armed robbery in which the victim was killed.

== Escape and manhunt ==
Sin escaped from Pusan Penitentiary in Pusan on January 20, 1997, through a bathroom ventilation shaft. He had dieted to lose weight in order to fit in the air shaft, and spent several months sawing through metal bars that blocked its outlet. He remained on the run for two years, six months, during which he committed numerous thefts and other crimes. The failure of the police to recapture Sin despite a nationwide manhunt became a public embarrassment for Korean law enforcement.

In July 1998, Sin was recognized and questioned by policemen in Gangnam, Seoul. He narrowly escaped arrest in a scuffle, but police recovered the stolen car he had been driving. In the car they found a diary detailing his escape and subsequent activities, as well as a large amount of cash and other stolen goods. The car also contained a wig, stolen identification papers, and several car license plates. It was determined that the bills had been stolen during several break-ins in the wealthy Bangbae district of Seoul. According to the diary, Sin had previously hidden from police by climbing into manholes. This discovery led police to undertake a search of the sewer system in the vicinity of Daemosan in Gangnam, Seoul, in July 1998, without results. Soon after this, the reward for assistance in capturing Sin was increased to 50 million won, the largest reward offered by South Korean police until that time.

The diary revealed that policemen had stopped the fugitive for minor offenses several times since his escape. On May 4 he had been found driving a car in Daegu with an illegally darkened windshield, and on July 9 he was confronted for smoking in a no-smoking area in Yangjae-dong, Seoul. In each case, Sin presented stolen identification cards, and police failed to notice that his face did not match the photographs. He kept company with a lot of women while he was on the run. They were always willing females he squired from various tabangs.

Law enforcement officers finally captured Sin on July 16, 1999, in the home of a woman he had been staying with in Suncheon, South Jeolla Province. The reward for his capture had been increased to 55 million won, but at the time of his capture Sin had in his possession 180 million won in cash, as well as other stolen goods. He had been spotted and reported to police by a repairman who had been called to work on a gas stove in the same apartment. After his arrest, Sin was returned to the same prison in Busan from which he had escaped two and a half years earlier.

According to authorities, Sin committed 104 thefts, five burglaries, and one rape during his years on the run, among other crimes. He also claimed to have given thousands of dollars to orphanages, the homeless, and disabled students during the same period.

== Public response ==
Because of his gifts to the needy and his success in evading police, Sin gained wide notoriety and even popularity. A Reuters report soon after his capture went so far as to call him a "Robin Hood," and he was also compared to the Korean folk hero Hong Gil-dong. Korean police strongly protested this elevated depiction of Sin; Ha Tae-sin, a police press representative, characterized the heroic image as a creation of the foreign press:

"The [South] Korean media were very familiar with Sin Chang-won's criminal journey, and did not think of him as a 'noble thief'; however, it appears that the foreign press wrote these articles without knowing the circumstances well. We intend to prepare a rebuttal and send it to the Korean offices of foreign media outlets."

An editorial in the Asia Times noted that Sin did not steal only from the rich, or give away a large part of his takings. Instead, he stole as opportunity allowed, and was also accused of other crimes such as rape.

Sin's escape and evasions were also compared to the plot of the US television series Prison Break, which became popular in Korea.

Sin's story was embarrassing to South Korean police not only because of their long failure to capture him, but also because he alleged wide misconduct by policemen. He reported having personally bribed police, and accused officers of raping his girlfriend. According to the Associated Press, about 50 officers were disciplined for failing to capture Sin, and 20 were implicated in his accusations of corruption.

Sin's image also benefited from the juxtaposition with contemporary government corruption scandals, such as the case of the governor of Gyeonggi Province, Lim Chang-yuel (임창열), who was arrested for bribery on the same day as Sin was captured. While corrupt officials were wealthy people enriching themselves at the expense of the poor, Sin was seen as a working-class hero, stealing from the rich and sharing with the needy. His popularity made him a fashion icon, and in particular, the colorful Missoni T-shirt worn by Sin when he was captured became a popular fashion item in Korea.
