= Gang of Samhan =

- Hangul: 강왕
- Hanja: 康王
- Revised Romanization: Gang Wang
- McCune–Reischauer: Kang Wang

King Gang was the 2nd king of Mahan confederacy. He reigned from 193 BCE to 189 BCE. His true name was Gang (Korean: 탁; Hanja: 卓). He was succeeded by An of Samhan (An Wang).

== See also ==
- List of Korean monarchs
- History of Korea

Gang of Samhan Mahan confederacy Died: 189 BC
Regnal titles
| Preceded by King Jun | King of Mahan confederacy 193 BC–189 BC | Succeeded by King An |
