= Naesosa =

Buddhist temple in Jeonbuk State, South Korea

- 내소사
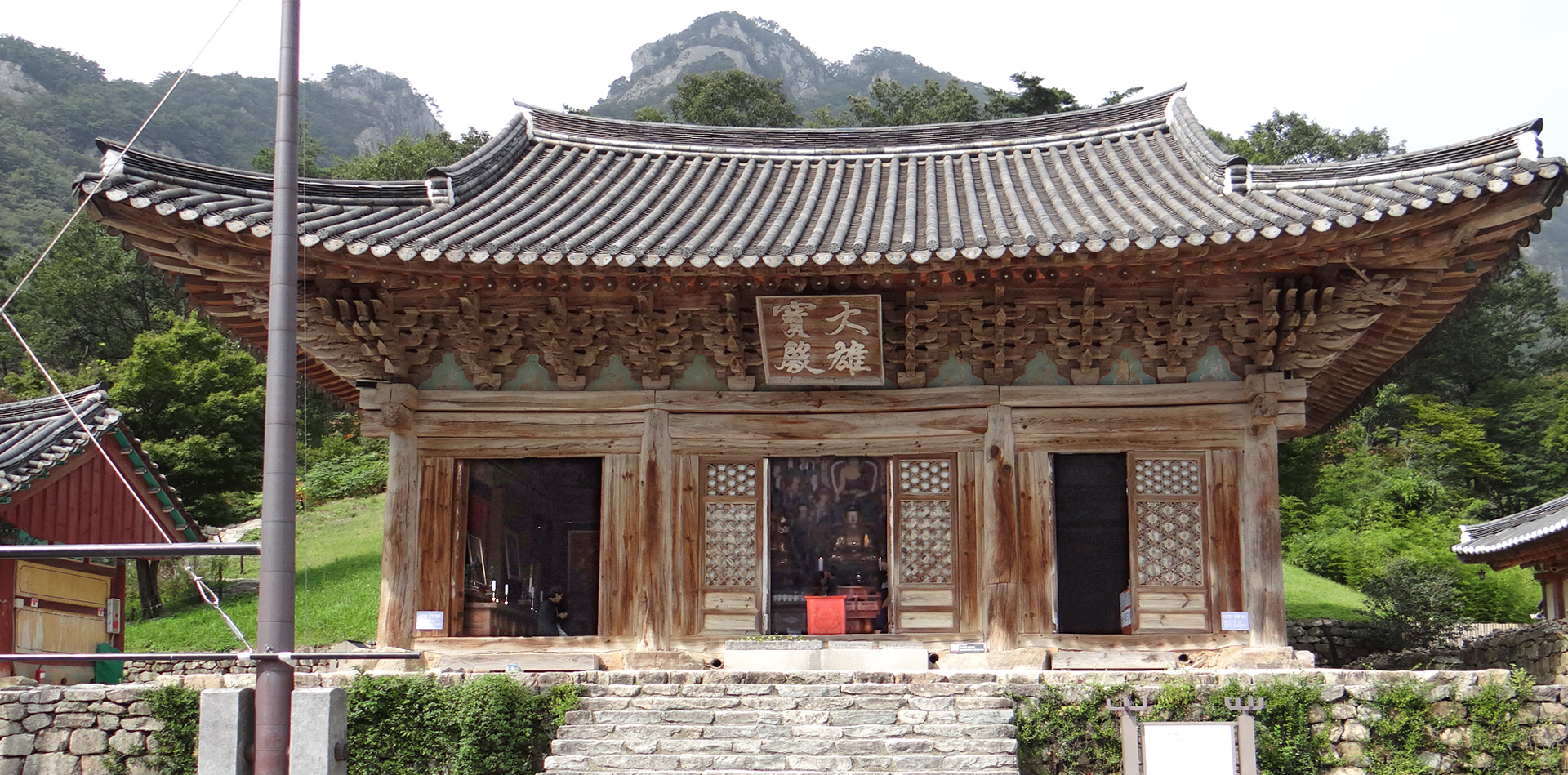
- Naesosa Temple in South Korea

- Location within South Korea

Religion
- Affiliation: Jogye Order of Korean Buddhism

Location
- Location: 243 Naesosa-ro Jinseo-myeon Buan-gun Jeonbuk State (Korean: 전북특별자치도 부안군 진서면 내소사로 243)
- Country: South Korea
- Coordinates: 35°37′03.1″N 126°35′14.1″E

Naesosa (Korean: 내소사), or Naeso Temple, is a Korean Buddhist temple located at the base of the mountain Naebyeongsan in Jinseo-myeon, Buan County, Jeonbuk State, South Korea.

It offers the Templestay program, where visitors can experience Buddhist culture.

== History ==
Naesosa was established in 633 CE by Buddhist Monk Hye-Gu during the Baekje Dynasty (18 BCE – 660 CE). The temple was rebuilt in 1633 CE by Monk Cheong-Min during the Joseon Dynasty (1392–1897). She originally established two temples in two different places. She named the larger one, Great Soraesa, and the smaller one, Small Soraesa. However, the former burned down, and the Naesosa Temple of today stands on the original location of the Small Soraesa Temple. All the original buildings were burned down during the Japanese invasion (1592–1597), but were reconstructed in 1633 by Seon Master Ven. Cheongmin.

The Main Buddha Hall (Treasure No. 291) was rebuilt at that time without using any iron nails. An interesting story has been passed down about the Main Buddha Hall. During the reign of Joseon's King Injo, a carpenter was employed to build Naesosa Temple's Main Buddha Hall. However, for three consecutive years all he did was carve rectangular wooden pillows, resembling wooden bricks. One day, to tease the stubborn carpenter, a child monk hid one of the pillows. Eventually the carpenter finished carving the wooden pillows and began to build the Dharma hall by mixing and matching the pillows.

Because one wooden pillow was missing, the carpenter blamed himself for being careless and insincere. Then, the child returned the wooden pillow he had hidden, but the carpenter didn't use it because he thought it was contaminated. He completed the construction of the building even though one pillow was missing. That's why even now the Main Buddha Hall is missing one wooden piece among its brackets.

When it was time for the dancheong, traditional Korean five-color cosmic designs, to be painted on the completed Buddha hall, a man came to the temple and volunteered to do it in 100 days on one condition: nobody could open the doors and look until he was finished. All the monks eagerly agreed. As the 100th day drew near, one child monk couldn't contain his curiosity any more, and peeped in through a crevice in the door. The man was nowhere to be seen, but a blue bird was painting a sacred design on the ceiling with a feather held in its beak. Sensing that the child monk was watching, the blue bird immediately flew away.

== Landscape ==
Naesosa Temple is also renowned for its entranceway lined with large fir trees, as well as many old, giant trees, including two zelkova trees named Dangsan Grandfather (over 500 years old) and Dangsan Grandmother (over 1,000 years old). In ancient times these two trees were considered the village guardians. There is also a 300-year-old Bodhi tree standing in front of Bongnaeru Pavilion. Near Naesosa are many tourist attractions such as Byeonsan Beach, Chaeseokgang River and Wolmyeongam Hermitage. In the last year of the Korean Empire (1897–1910), eminent men like Kim Seong-su, Song Jinu and Baek Gwan-su from nearby villages lived for extended periods at Naesosa Temple in order to study.

== Cultural properties ==
Naesosa Temple owns four items of state-designated cultural heritage and two province-designated tangible cultural objects. Among these, the Main Buddha Hall is especially beautiful with its floral lattice wooden doors and White-Robed Avalokitesvara painted on the back of the wall behind the main altar. The blue bird legend was possibly inspired by these works of art.

Other items of state-designated cultural heritage include the Goryeo era Bronze Bell (Treasure No. 277), a transcribed copy of the Lotus Sutra (Treasure No. 278) and a large scroll painting of the Vulture Peak Assembly (Treasure No. 1268). In addition there are: a Three-Story Stone Pagoda (Tangible Cultural Heritage of Jeonbuk State No. 124), and “Seolseondang Hall and monastic dormitory” (Tangible Cultural Heritage of Jeonbuk State No. 125).

The eminent monk of modern Korea, Hae-an Daejongsa, began monastic life and served as a resident monk at the temple. He promoted literacy by establishing a school named Gyemyeong Hagwon in front of the temple, and spread the tradition of Seon Buddhism in southwest Korea. Later, Ven. Hyesan U-im continued Ven. Hae-an's work by establishing Bongnae Seon Center in the temple and he also expanded the temple to its current size.

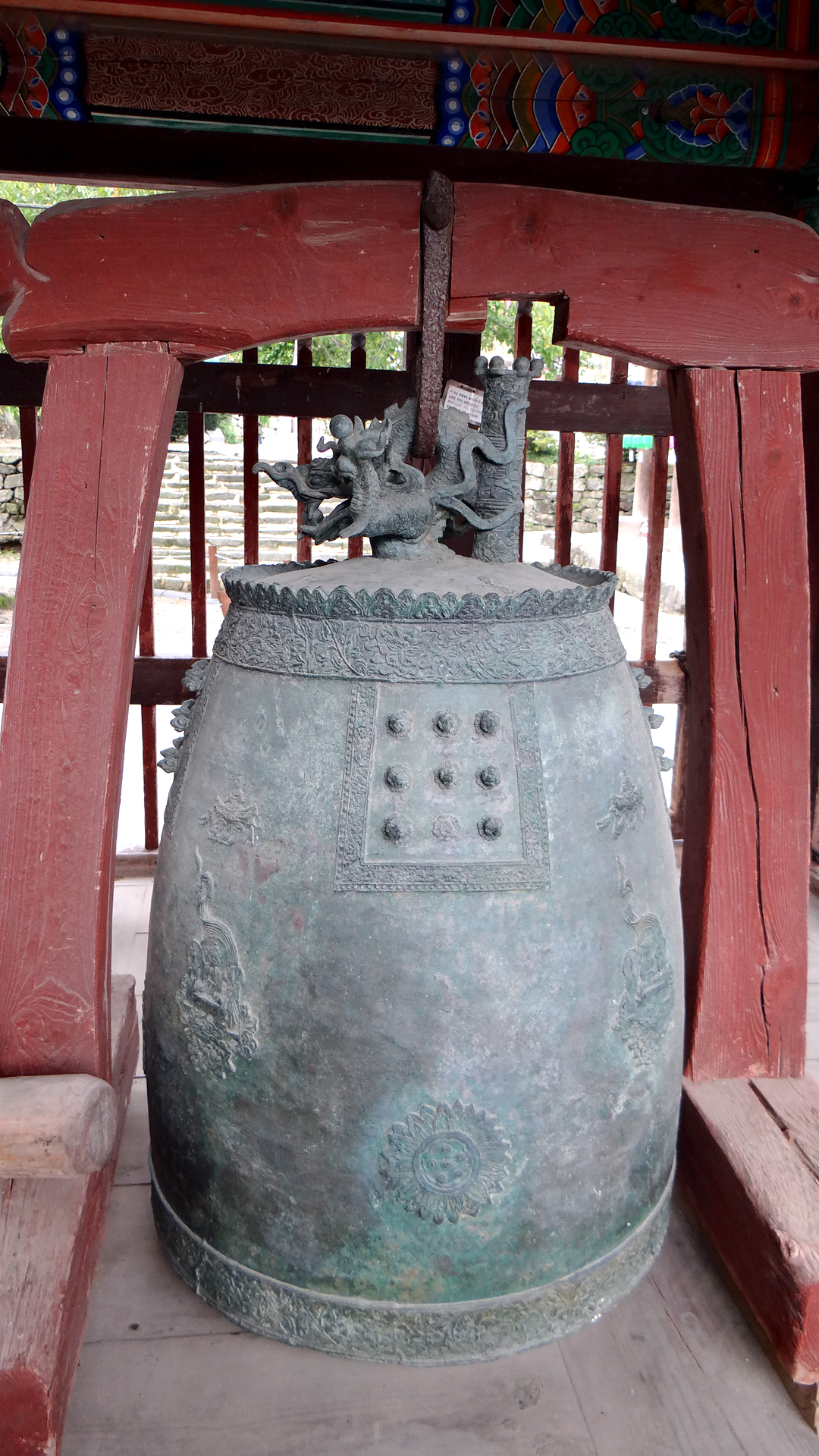
Naesosa Goryeo Bronze Bell

=== Goryeodongjong – Treasure #277 ===
Beomjonggak houses Naesosa's Goryeodongjong, a bronze bell cast during the Goryeo Dynasty (918–1392 CE) in 1222.

Originally located at Cheongnimsa (temple) of Naebyeonsan (mountain), the bell was moved to Naesosa in 1850.

A figure of Buddha is embossed in the center of the bell. The principal Buddha in the center is seated on a lotus flower while two Bodhisattvas on either side are standing. A magnificent plant shape is seen on the upper and lower part of the bell.

The bell hanger has a carved dragon and triad pattern.

The bell strike point has a lotus flower pattern like a sunflower.

The bronze bell exhibits the typical style of bells made toward the end of the Goryeo period bearing a strong resemblance to that of other Goryeo Dynasty bells.

Goryeodongjong is 103 cm/40.5in high, 67 cm/26in wide and weighs 420 kg/926 lb.

=== Beophwagyeongjeolbonsabon – Treasure #278 ===
Beophwagyeongjeolbonsabon is a transcription in seven parts of the Saddharmapundarika Sutra (The Lotus Sutra) done in Ink on White Paper.

This is the basic sutra of Cheontaejong, one of Korean Buddhist sects, and its main concept that everyone can be Buddha. Each one of the seven parts of the sutra can be folded.

=== Daeungbojeon – Treasure #291 ===
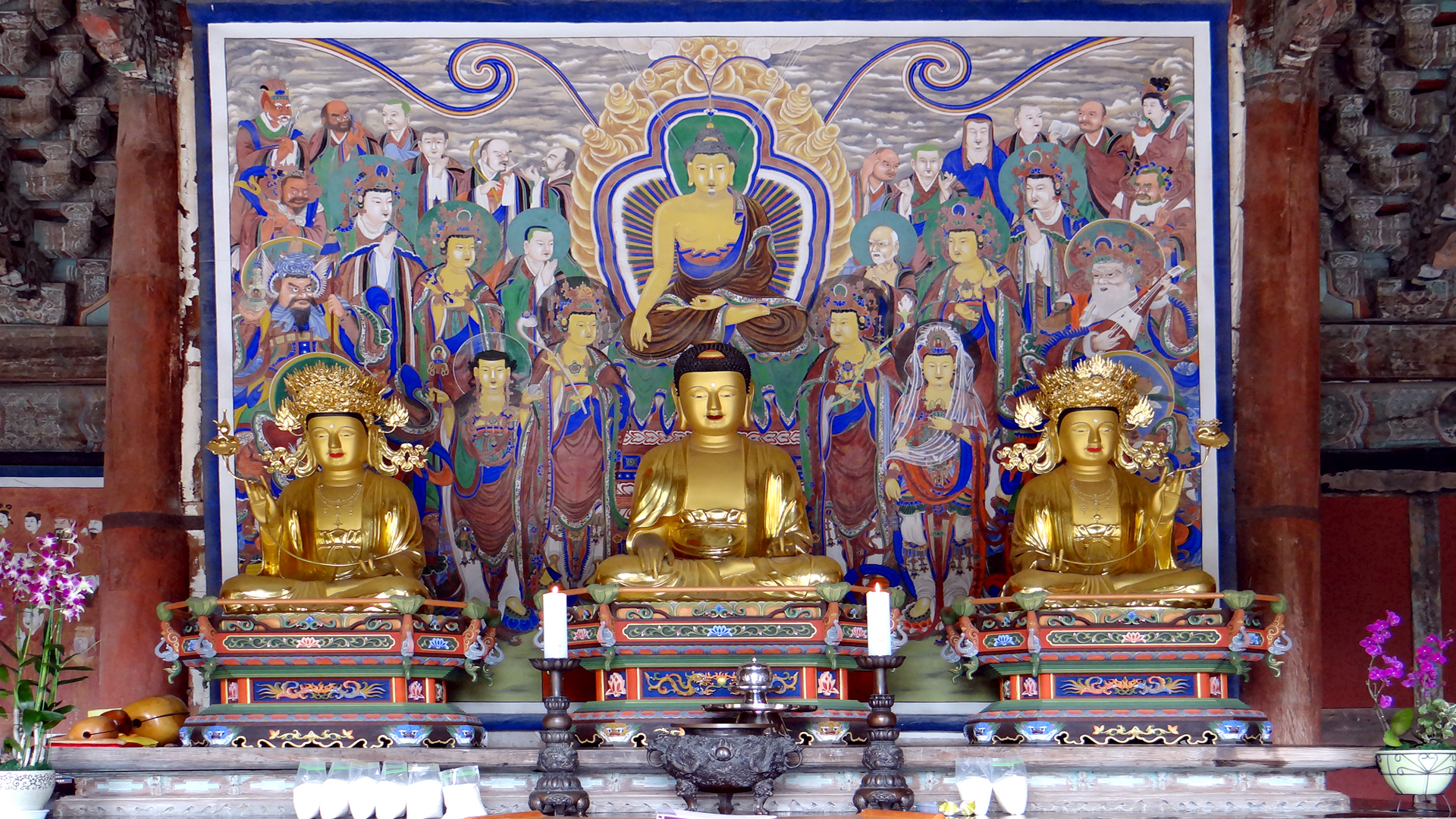
Naesosa Daeungjeon Triad

Daeungbojeon is the main sanctum (worship hall) at Naesosa where Sakyamuni Buddha in the center, Samantabhadra on the right, and Manjusri on the left are enshrined. This hall was built in 1633 at the time that Cheong-min rebuilt the temple. Constructed at the end of the Joseon Dynasty of wood only, Daeungbojeon uses no nails. Daeungbojeon consists of three front rooms and side rooms with an octagonal roof.

Inside the building the inner column-heads supporting the roof are decorated at the top of each pillar in a pattern of lotus buds. The end of the beams depict a dragon with a fish in its mouth. The ribs of the lattice door are adorned with lotus and chrysanthemums. The Merciful Goddess, ‘Avalokitesvara Bodhisattva in White Robe' painted behind the Sakyamuni Buddha statue is the largest of its kind in Korea.

== Gallery ==
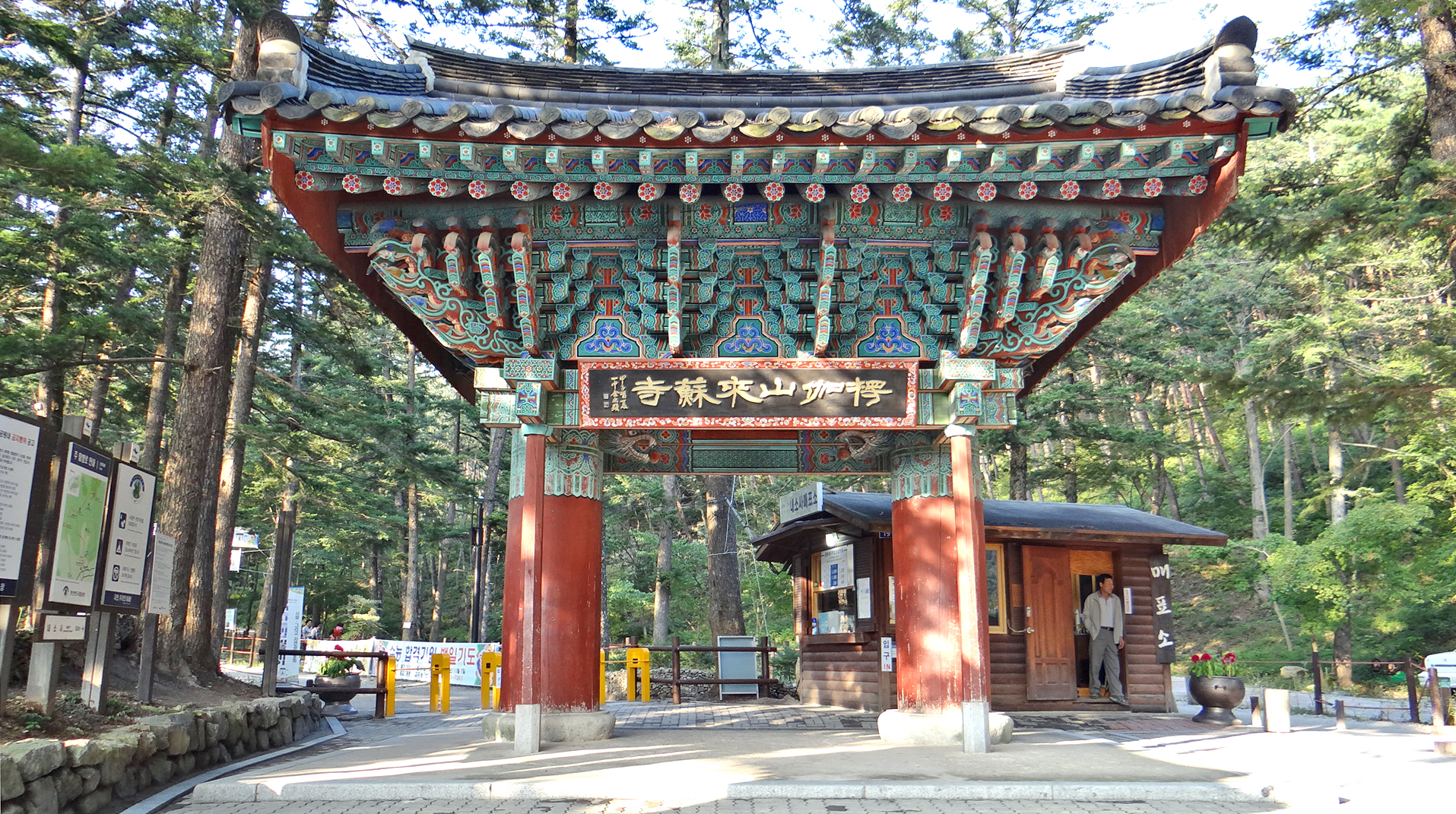
Naesosa Iljumun - first gate at the entrance called the "One-Pillar Gate".

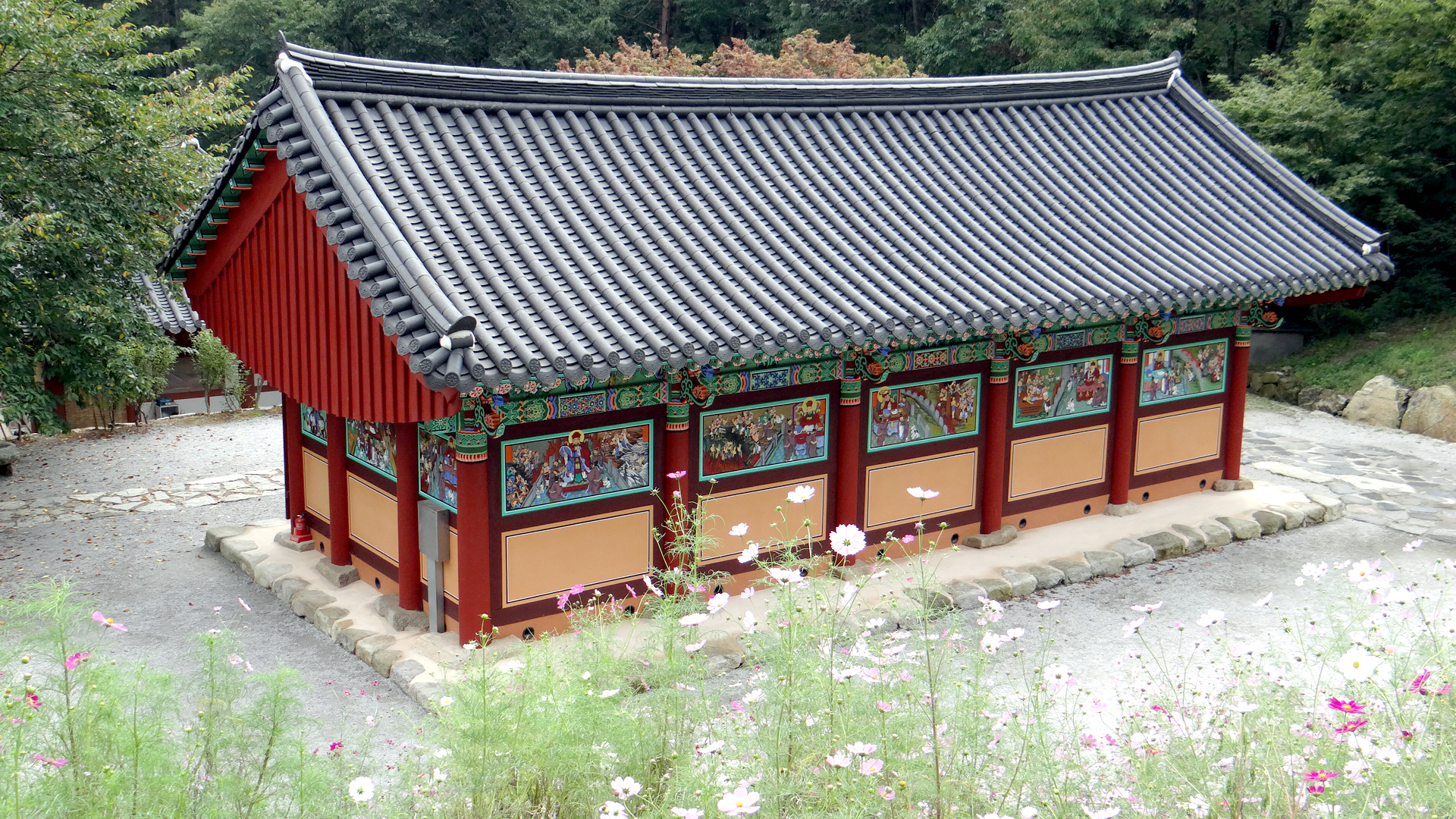
Naesosa Myeongbujeon - Judgement Hall.

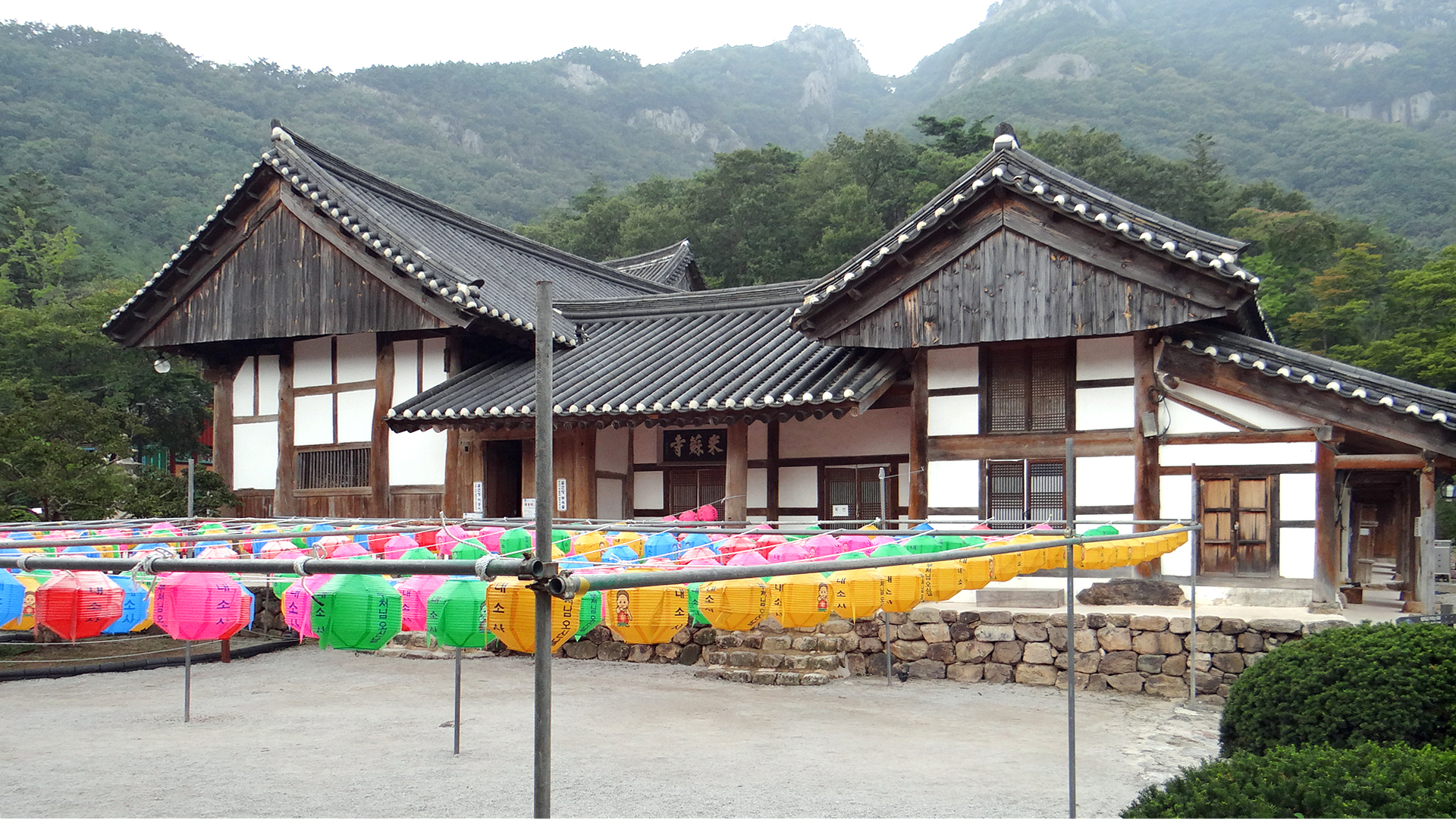
Naesosa Seolseondang - a dormitory for the monks.

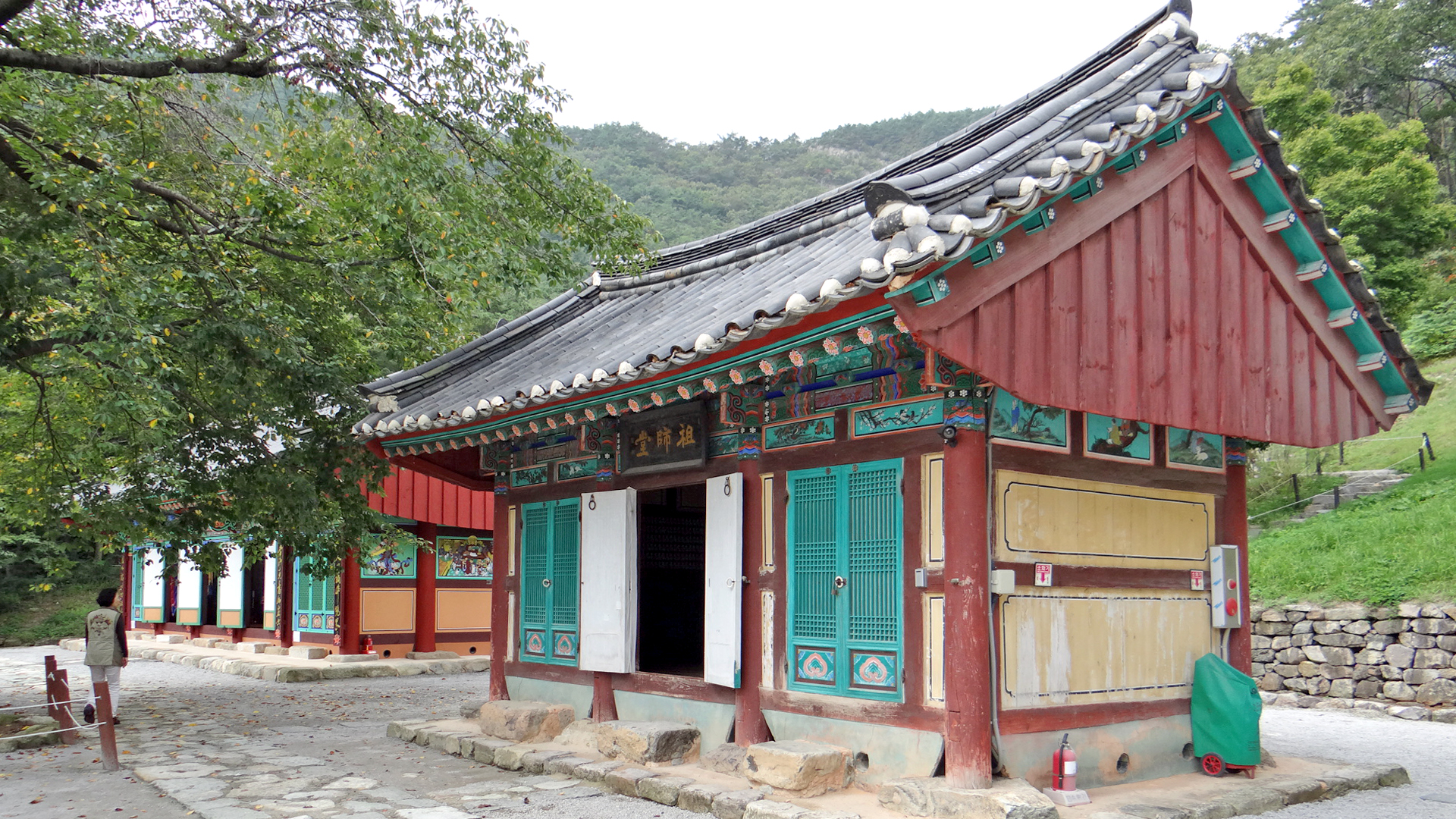
Naesosa Josajeon.

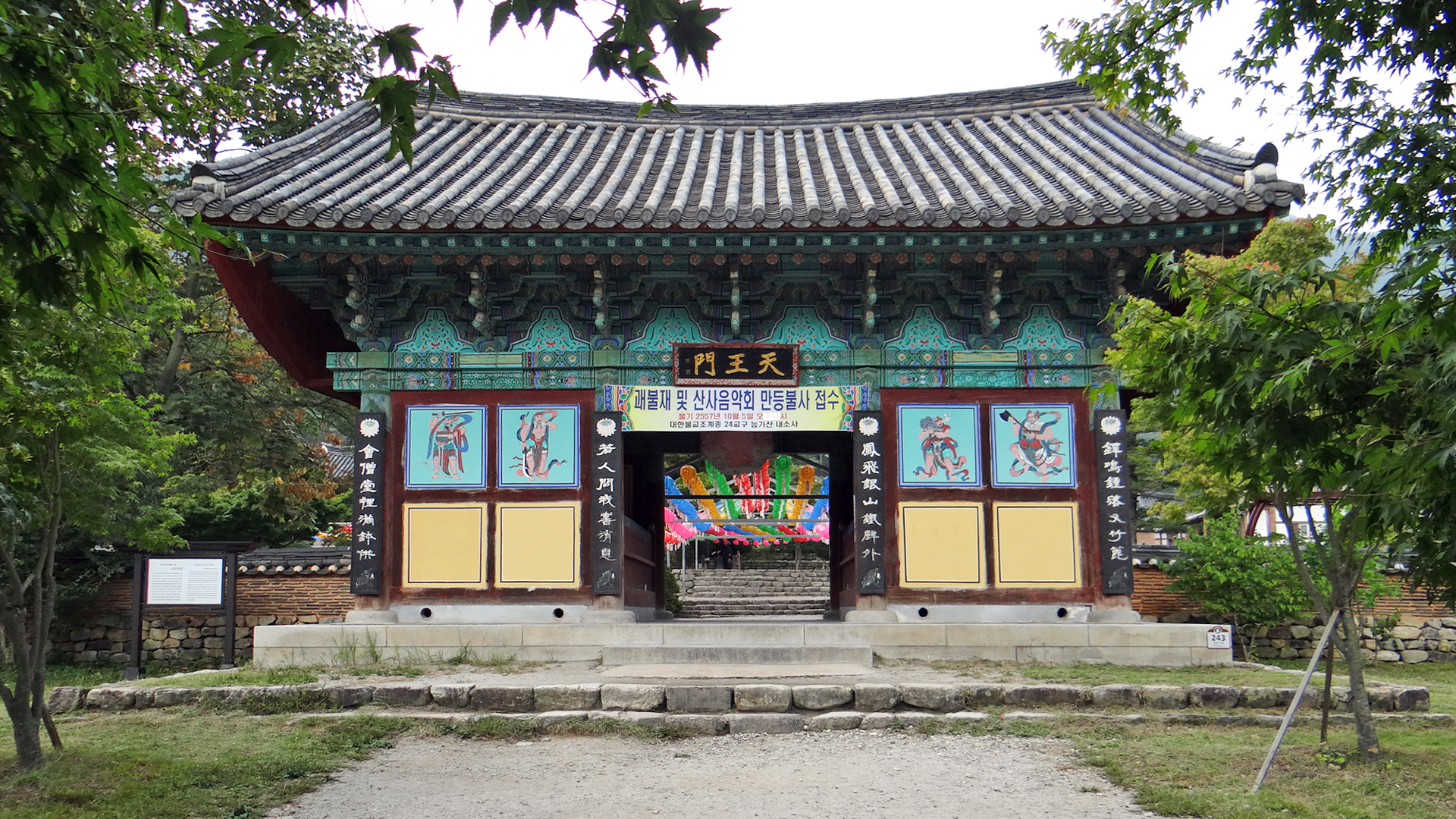
Naesosa Cheonwangmun - Gate of the Four Heavenly Kings.

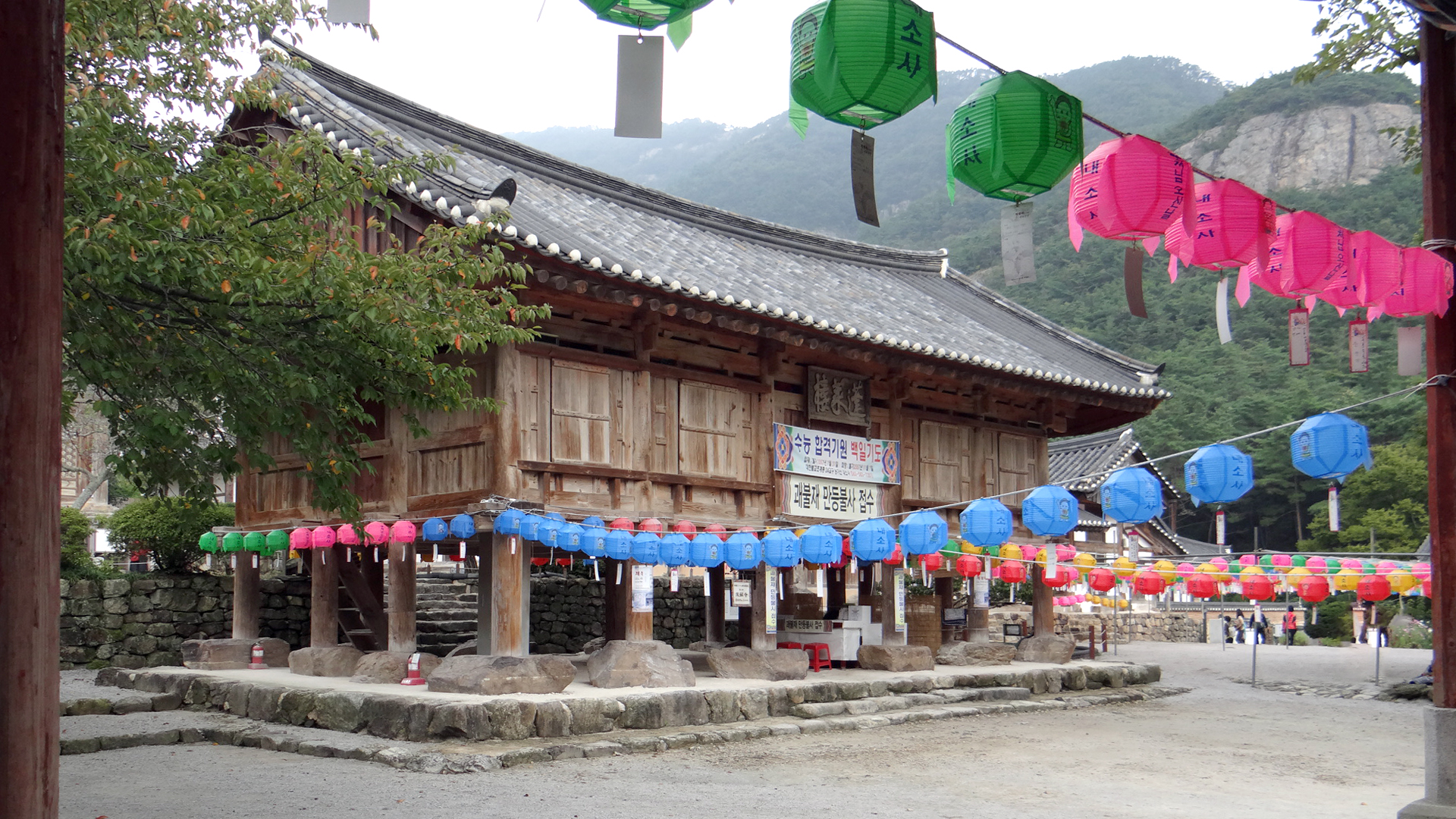
Naesosa Bongnaeru - a pavilion.

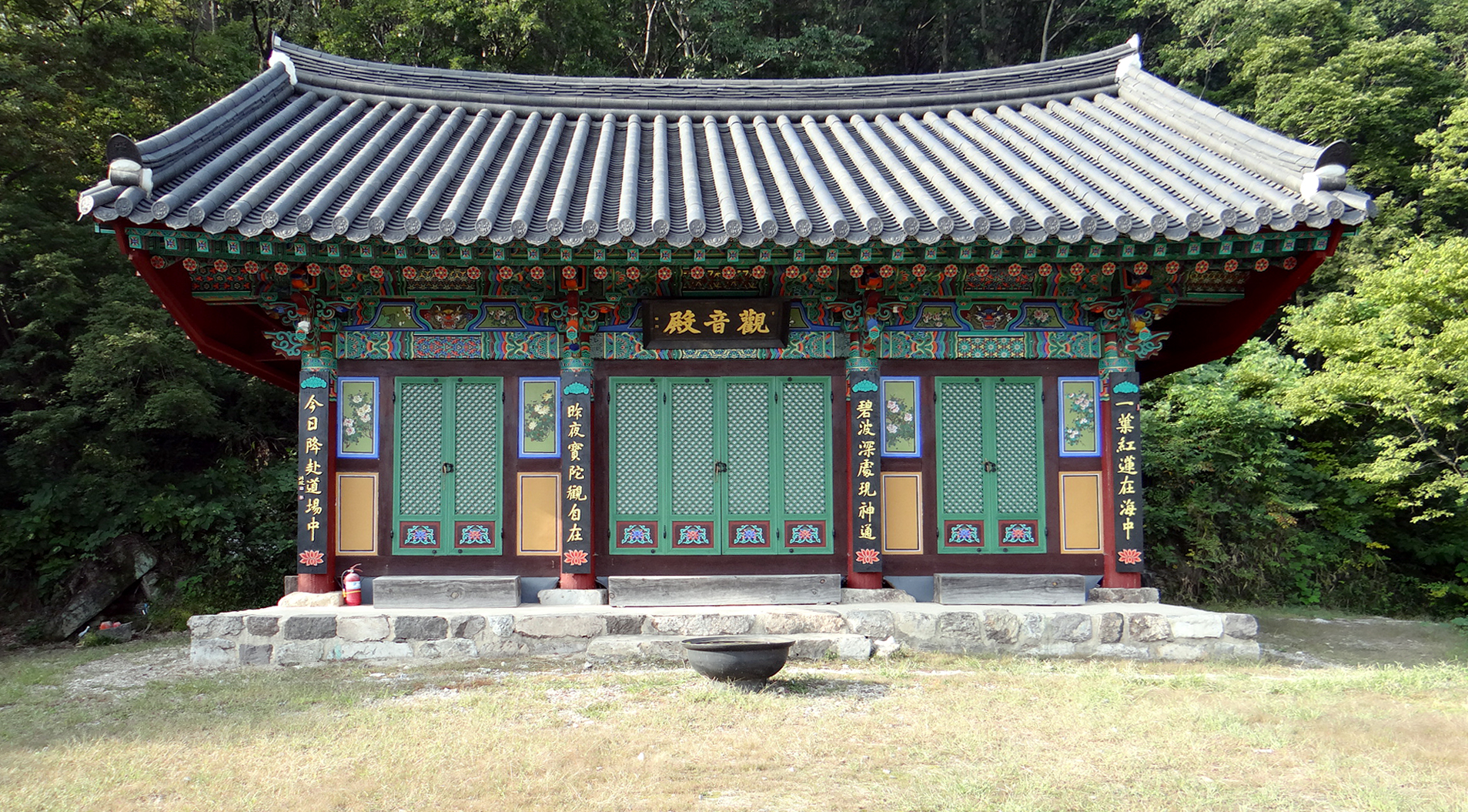
Naesosa Avolokitesvara Hall.

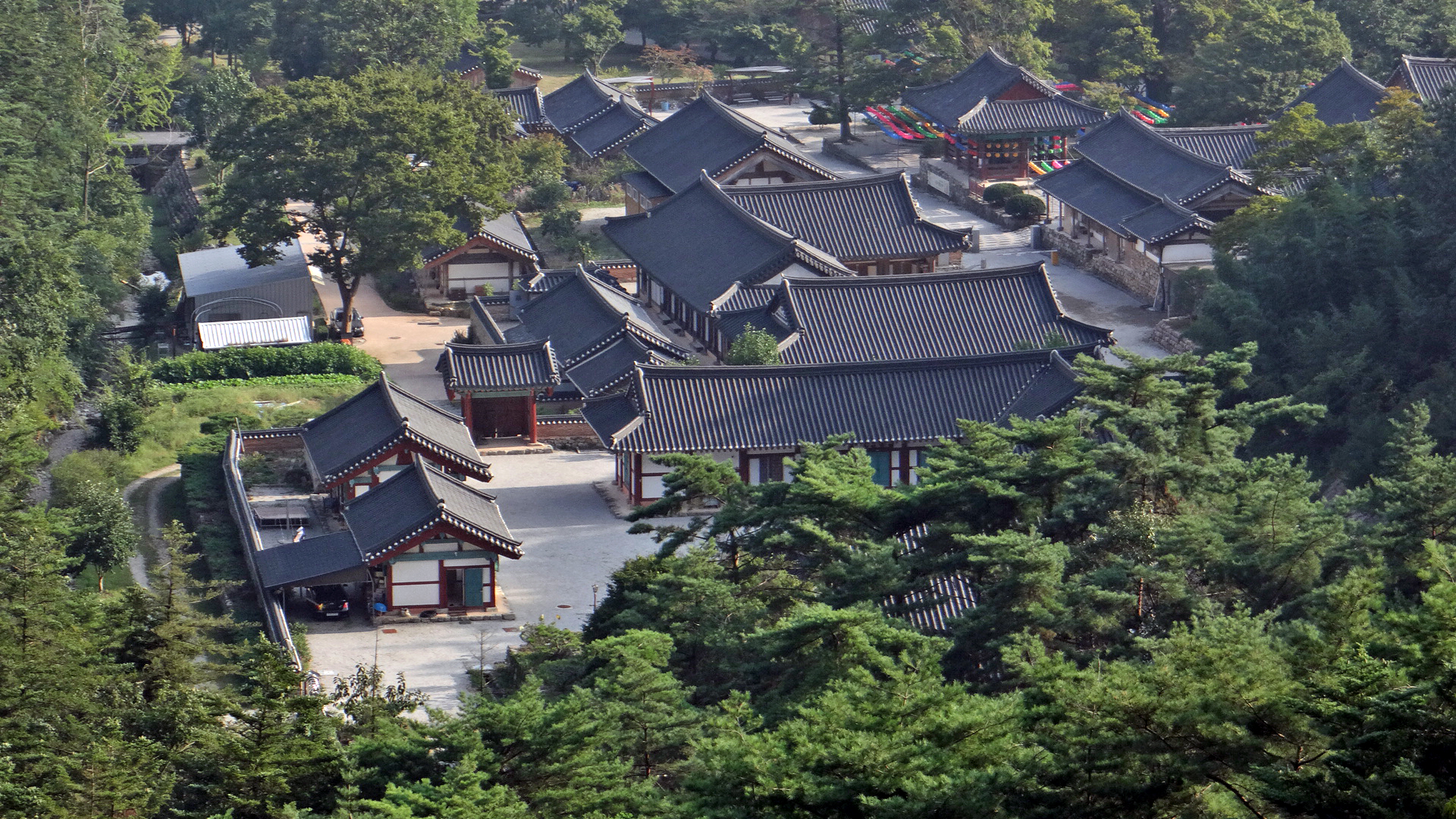
Aerial view of Naesosa.

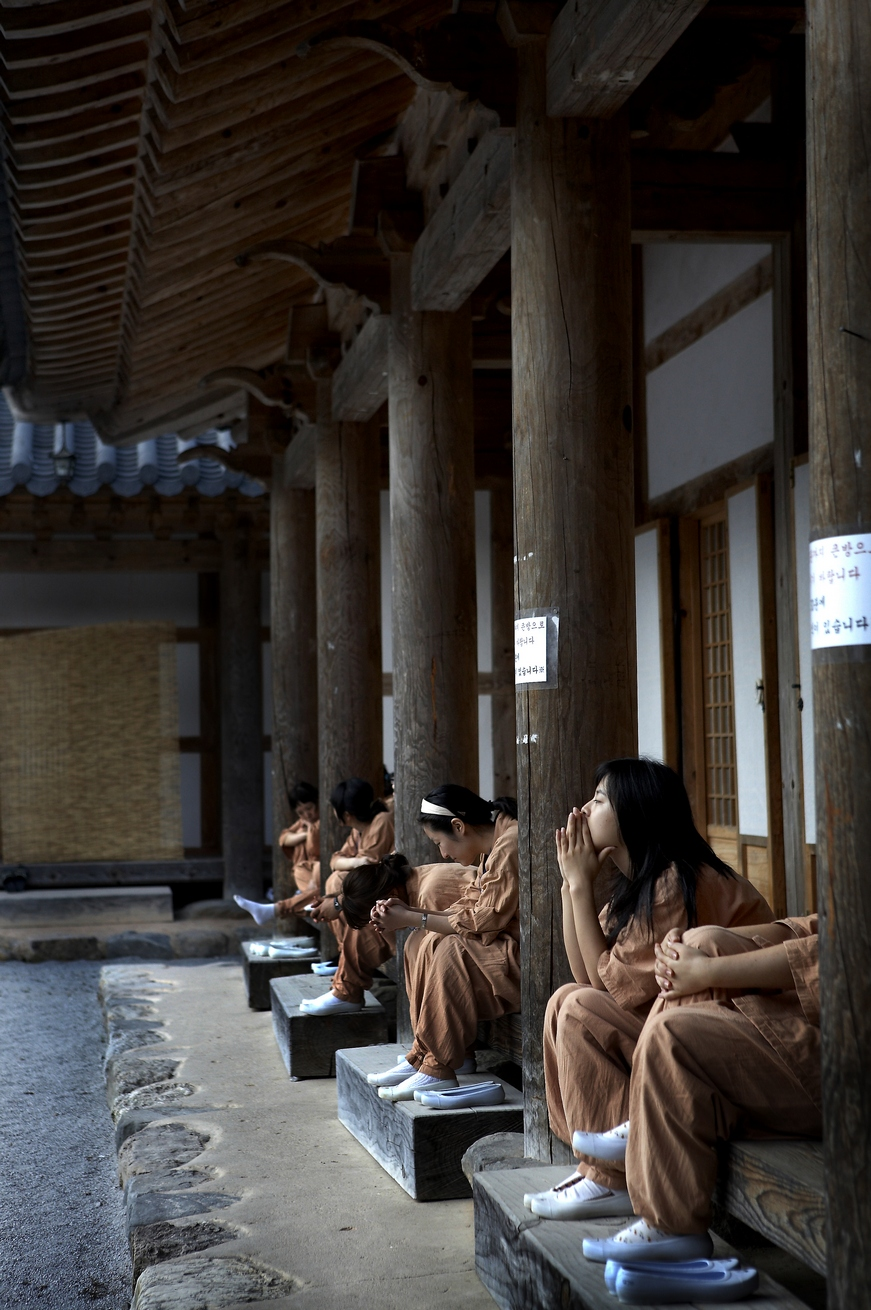
Temple stay of Naesosa.

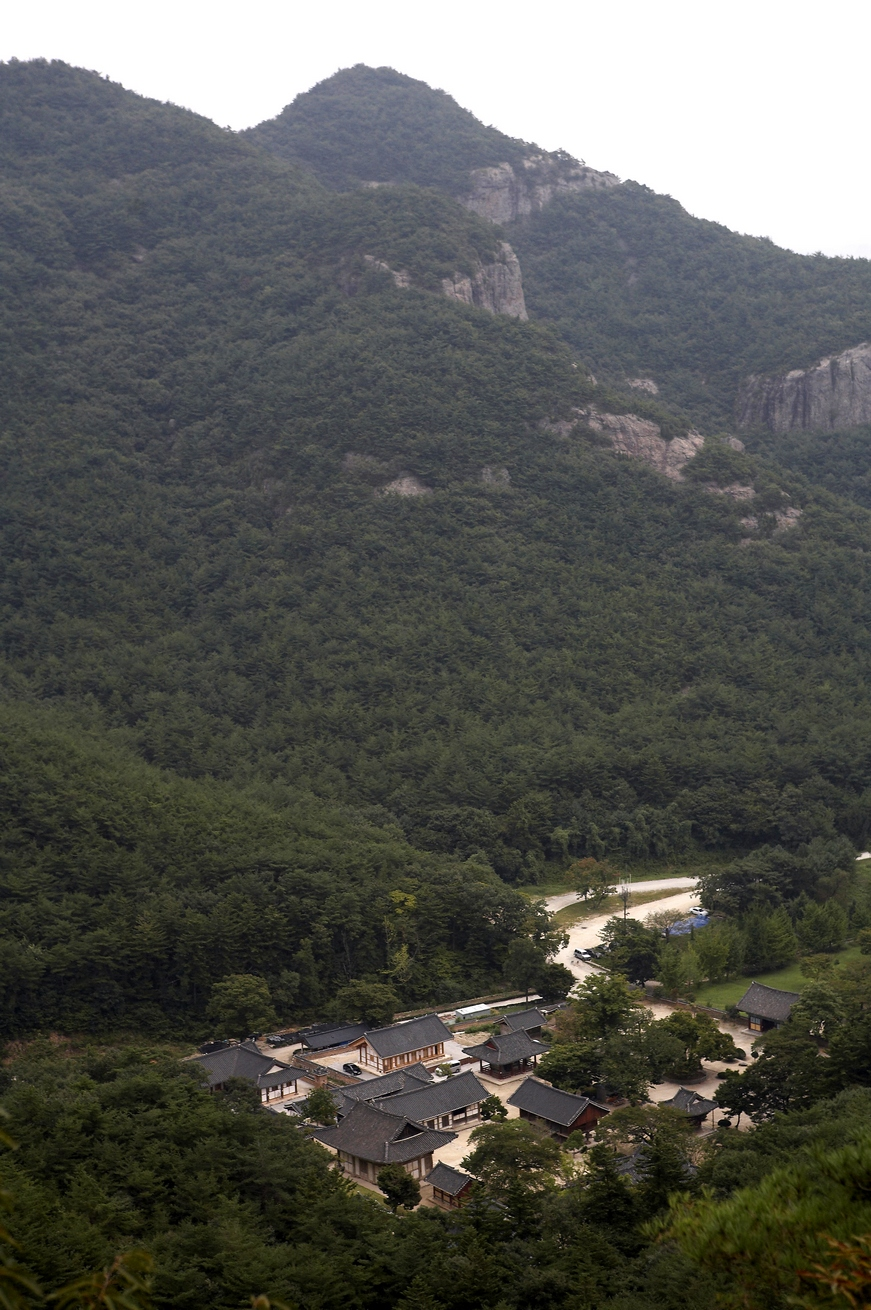
View of Naesosa in South Korea.

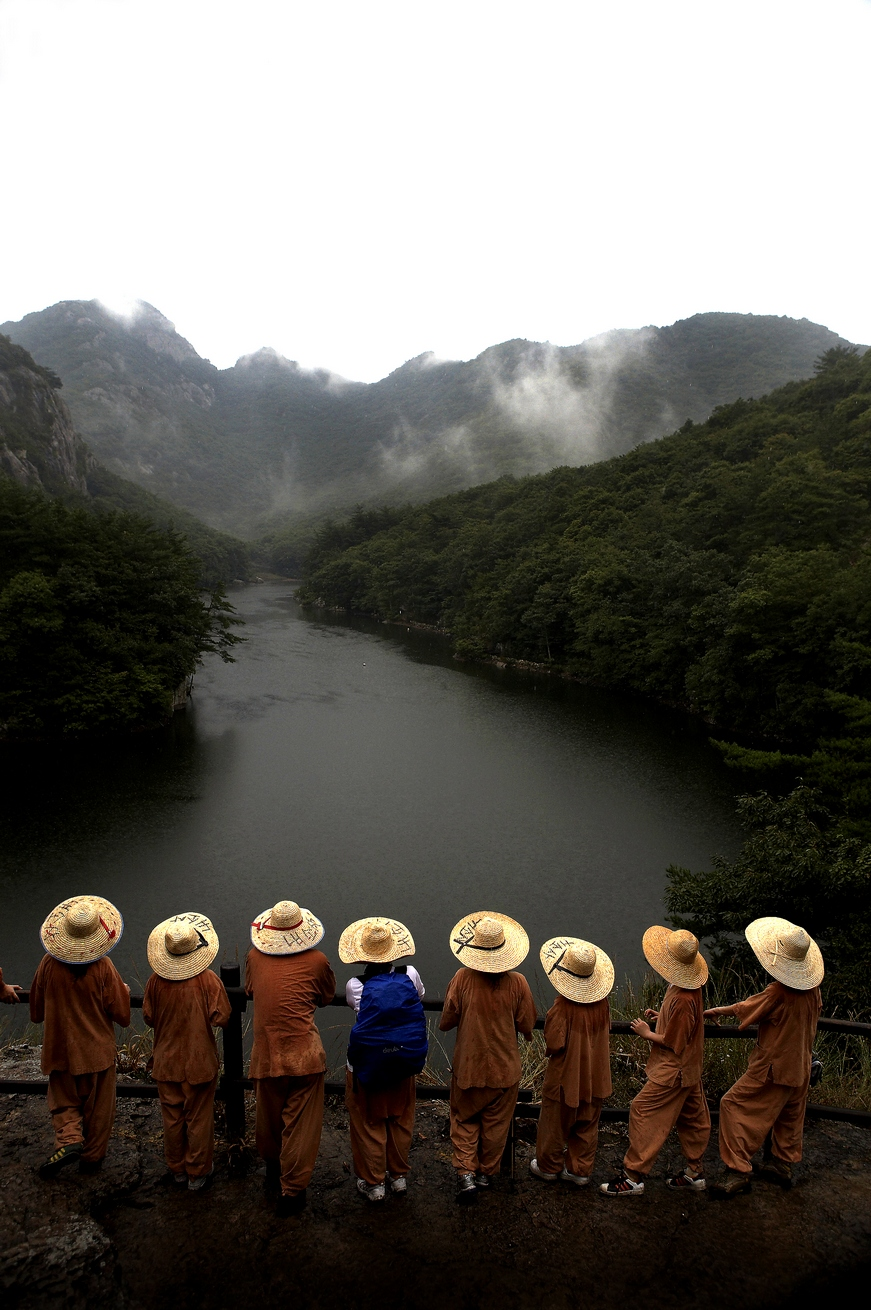
Temple stay of Naesosa.
