= Won of Samhan =

King of Mahan confederacy

- Hangul: 원왕
- Hanja: 元王
- Revised Romanization: Hyo Wang
- McCune–Reischauer: Hyo Wang

King Hyo (Korean: 기훈; Hanja: 箕勳) was the 8th king of Mahan confederacy. He reigned from 58 BCE to 33 BCE. His true name was Hyo (Korean: 훈; Hanja: 勳). He was succeeded by Gye of Samhan (Gye Wang).

== See also ==
- List of Korean monarchs
- History of Korea

Won of Samhan Mahan confederacy Died: 33 BC
Regnal titles
Preceded by King Yang	King of Mahan confederacy 58 BC–33 BC	Succeeded by King Gye
