= Hye of Samhan =

- Hangul: 혜왕
- Hanja: 恵王
- Revised Romanization: Hye Wang
- McCune–Reischauer: Hye Wang

King Hye (Korean: 기식; Hanja: 箕寔) was the 4th king of Mahan confederacy. He reigned from 157 BCE to 144 BCE. His true name was Hye (Korean: 식; Hanja: 寔). He was succeeded by Myung of Samhan (Myung Wang).

== See also ==
- List of Korean monarchs
- History of Korea

Hye of Samhan Mahan confederacy Died: 144 BC
Regnal titles
Preceded by King An	King of Mahan confederacy 157 BC–144 BC	Succeeded by King Myung
