= Seokjeong Literary Museum =

Coordinates: 35.7400°N 126.7354°E

- Established: 2011
- Location: Buan, South Korea
- Type: Literary Museum
- Website: shinseokjeong.com

Korean name
- Hangul: 석정문학관
- Hanja: 夕汀文學館
- RR: Seokjeong munhakgwan
- MR: Sŏkchŏng munhakkwan

Seokjeong Literary Museum (Korean: 석정문학관) is a memorial hall built in Buan in 2011 to honor Shin Seok Jeong's literary spirit. Shin Seok-jeong, who was born in Buan, was an idyllic and participating poet. Seokjeong Literary Museum exhibits a collection of his poems and autograph manuscripts. It consists of a permanent exhibition hall and a planning exhibition hall. Si-nangsong (Poetry recitation) contest and essay contest are held annually here.

== See also ==
- Park Mok-wol
