= Shin Seok Jeong =

Shin Seok-jung
- Born: July 7, 1907
- Died: July 6, 1974 (aged 66)
- Citizenship: South Korean
- Writing career
- Language: Korean

- Shin Seok Jeong
- Hangul: 신석정
- Hanja: 辛錫正
- RR: Sin Seokjeong
- MR: Sin Sŏkchŏng

Art name
- Hangul: 석정
- Hanja: 夕汀
- RR: Seokjeong
- MR: Sŏkchŏng

Shin Seok-jung was a Korean poet. He was born in 1907 in Buan, North Jeolla Province. After graduating from Buan public school, he went to Seoul and studied Buddhist texts for a year in Gangwon Province, at the predecessor of Dongguk University.

In 1931, he began his career as a member of the 'Simunhak'(시문학, The meaning of 'poetic literature', a monthly magazine specializing in poetry). He established a unique position by publishing an idyllic poetry. He served as a schoolteacher at Buan Middle School and Jeonju High School.

In July 1976, Shin Seok-Jeong's tombstone was constructed in Jeonju Deokjin Park.

== Works list ==
- Candlelight (1939)
- Flowering Shrubs (1946)
- A Sad Pastoral (1947)
- Glacier (1956)
- Do You Know That Faraway Land? (2020)

== See also ==
- Seokjeong Literary Museum
