= An of Samhan =

3rd king of Mahan confederacy

- Hangul: 안왕
- Hanja: 安王
- Revised Romanization: An Wang
- McCune–Reischauer: An Wang

King An (Korean: 기감; Hanja: 箕龕) was the 3rd king of Mahan confederacy. He reigned from 189 BCE to 157 BCE. His true name was An (Korean: 감; Hanja: 龕). He was succeeded by Hye of Samhan (Hye Wang).

== See also ==
- List of Korean monarchs
- History of Korea

An of Samhan Mahan confederacy Died: 157 BC
Regnal titles
Preceded by King Gang	King of Mahan confederacy 189 BC–157 BC	Succeeded by King Hye
