= Gimje =

City in North Jeolla, South Korea

- Municipal City
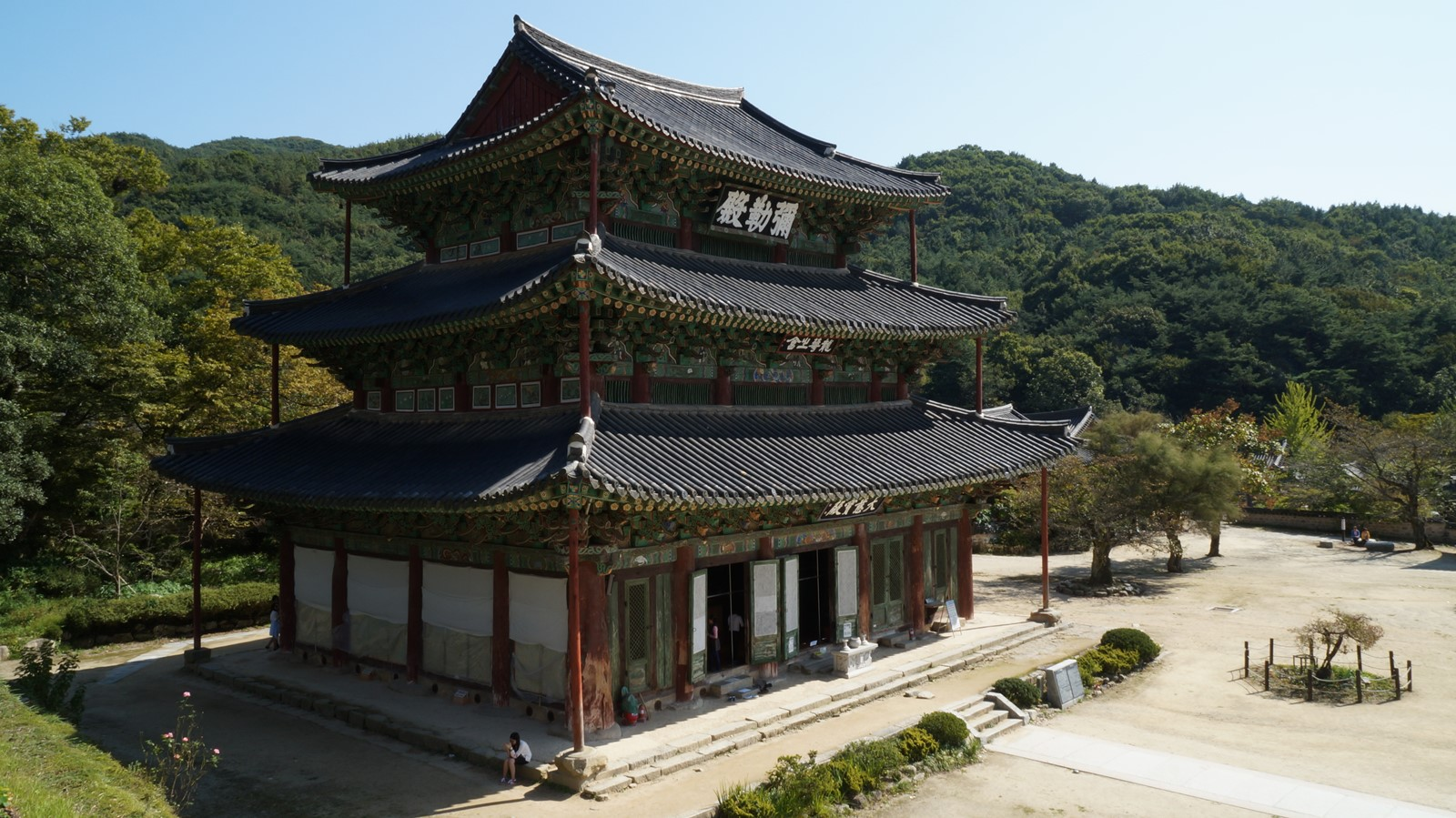
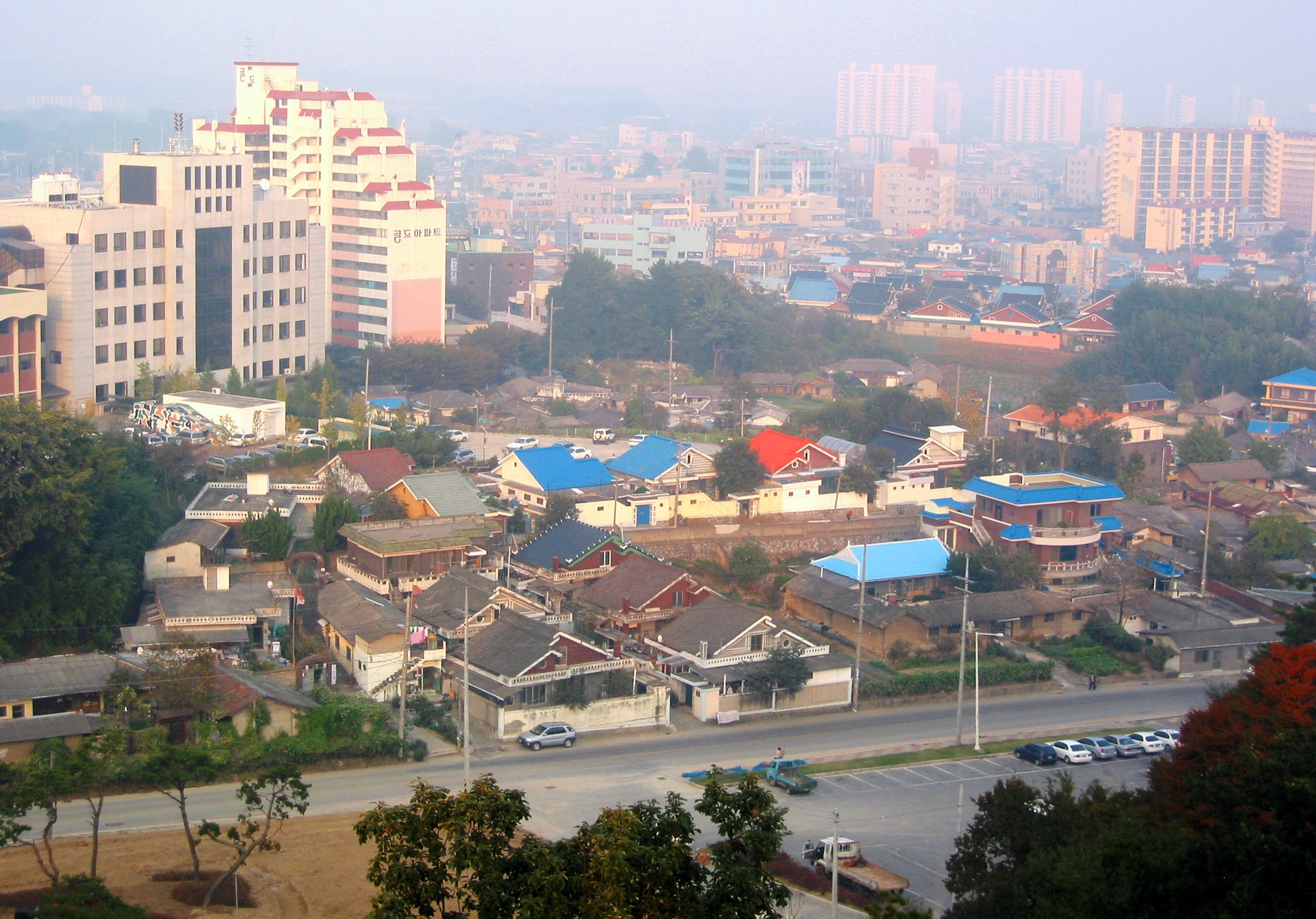
- From the left: Geumsansa, cityscape

- Flag Emblem of Gimje

- Location in South Korea
- Coordinates: 35°48′06″N 126°53′20″E
- Country: South Korea
- State: Jeonbuk
- Administrative divisions: 1 eup, 14 myeon, 4 dong

Government
  - mayor: Jeong Seong-ju (정성주)

Area
  - Total: 545.19 km^{2} (210.50 sq mi)

Population (November, 2022)
  - Total: 88,479
  - Density: 162.29/km^{2} (420.33/sq mi)
  - Dialect: Jeolla
- Time zone: UTC+9 (Korea Standard Time)
- Area code: +82-63

Korean name
- Hangul: 김제시
- Hanja: 金堤市
- RR: Gimje-si
- MR: Kimje-si

Gimje (Korean: 김제; Korean pronunciation: [kim.dʑe]) is a city in North Jeolla Province, South Korea.

== History ==
The Gimje area is located on the "great plains" of Korea and has been cultivated since ancient times. Nations of early date ascended in the year 200. The Baekje Kingdom invaded and incorporated several small mahan states in the 13th year of King Onjo's reign. The Baekje Kingdom changed its name to Byeogol, but when is not clear.

In the Joseon period, Gimje first appeared in the year 1466 when Sejo of Joseon ruled. He promoted Gimje to an independent county. In 1628, Gwanghaegun of Joseon combined the nearby district of Mangyeong District into Gimje County.

Baekje was ruined by the Tang and Silla, and Unified Silla changed the city's name to Gimje.

Goryeo promoted Gimje to Gimje District in the 21st year of King Injong's reign.

The city government has always highly regarded and promoted the cultivation of rice and other crop species. From the Baekje Kingdom through the 21st century, Gimje has been one of the best areas for growing rice.

== Horizon Festival ==
Gimje is known as the region where the sky meets the ground, hence the festival of horizon or 'jipyeongseon.' It is held at Byeokgolje area, and more than one million tourists visit it each year. Gimje Horizon Festival hosts a wide range of programs including Samullori (traditional percussion quartet) contest, rural landscape drawing contest, celebratory performances, street parade, Ssireum (wrestling), and traditional weddings. Gimje is the only region where Koreans can see the horizon from a landlocked area. The festival was appointed an Excellent Festival for 4 years between 2004 and 2008. It also provides city residents a chance to experience traditional farming methods.

== Twin towns – sister cities ==
Gimje is twinned with:

- Kikuchi, Kumamoto, Japan (1985)
- Nantong, Jiangsu, China (1997)
- Gumi, North Gyeongsang, South Korea (1998)
- Donghae, Gangwon, South Korea (1999)

== People from Gimje ==
- Masutatsu Oyama, Zainichi Korean Karate master, founder of Kyokushin Karate (Real Name: Choi Yeong-eui, 최영의, Choe Yeong-ui)
- Sin Chang-won (신창원), notorious South Korean criminal
- Casanova Wong, South Korean martial artist (Taekwondo), martial arts actor and film producer (Real Name: Kim Yong-ho, 김용호, Gim Yong-ho)
- Lee Jung-hyun (이정현), South Korean actress, singer and K-pop idol
- Kim Se-jeong (김세정), South Korean actress, singer, dancer and K-pop idol, former member of K-pop girlgroups I.O.I, gugudan (in which she was the leader of the group), and the second gugudan's subgroup, gugudan SeMiNa.

== See also ==
- Geumsansa
- List of cities in South Korea
