= Dapo =

Dapo may refer to:

== People ==
=== Given name ===
- Dapo Abiodun (born 1960), Nigerian businessman and politician
- Dapo Adelugba (1939–2014), Nigerian academic
- Dapo Adeola, British-Nigerian illustrator
- Dapo Afolayan or Oladapo Afolayan (born 1997), English football player
- Dapo Folorunsho Asaju (born 1961), Nigerian bishop and academic
- Dapo Lam Adesina (born 1978), Nigerian politician
- Dapo Mebude (born 2001), Scottish football player
- Dapo Olorunyomi (born 1957), Nigerian journalist
- Dapo Sarumi, Nigerian politician
- Dapo Torimiro, Nigerian musician

=== Surname ===
- Aida Đapo, real name of Idda van Munster (born 1990), Bosnian celebrity
- Amra Đapo (born 1976), Croatian basketball player
- Ronnie Dapo (born 1952), American child actor
- Siphamandla Dapo (born 1989), South African cricketer

== Places ==
- Dapo, China
- Dapo Pond, Taitung County, Taiwan
- Dapo River, Congo
- Dapo-Iboké, Ivory Coast

== Other ==
- Dapo language (disambiguation)
- Dapo (bracket style) – component of traditional Korean architecture
- Da-Po Junior High School, part of the system of education in Taoyuan City
