= Jusimpo =

Bracket in Korean architecture

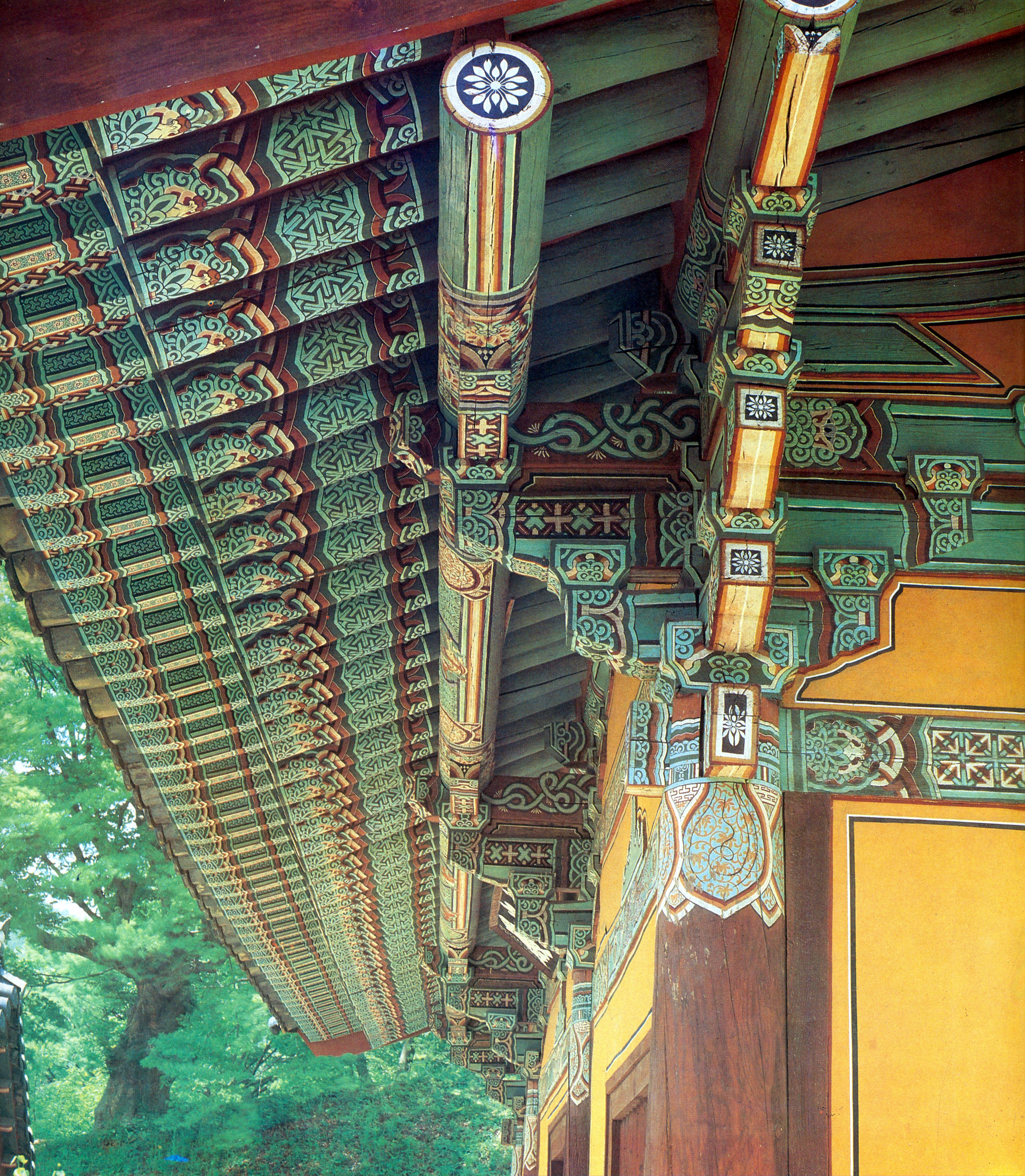
Bongjeongsa Geukrakjeon

Jusimpo (Korean: 주심포) is a style of bracket in Korean architecture that is installed at the top of a column. It is a combination of a bracket, a ridgepole, cheomcha, salmi, and other structural members.

== Overview ==
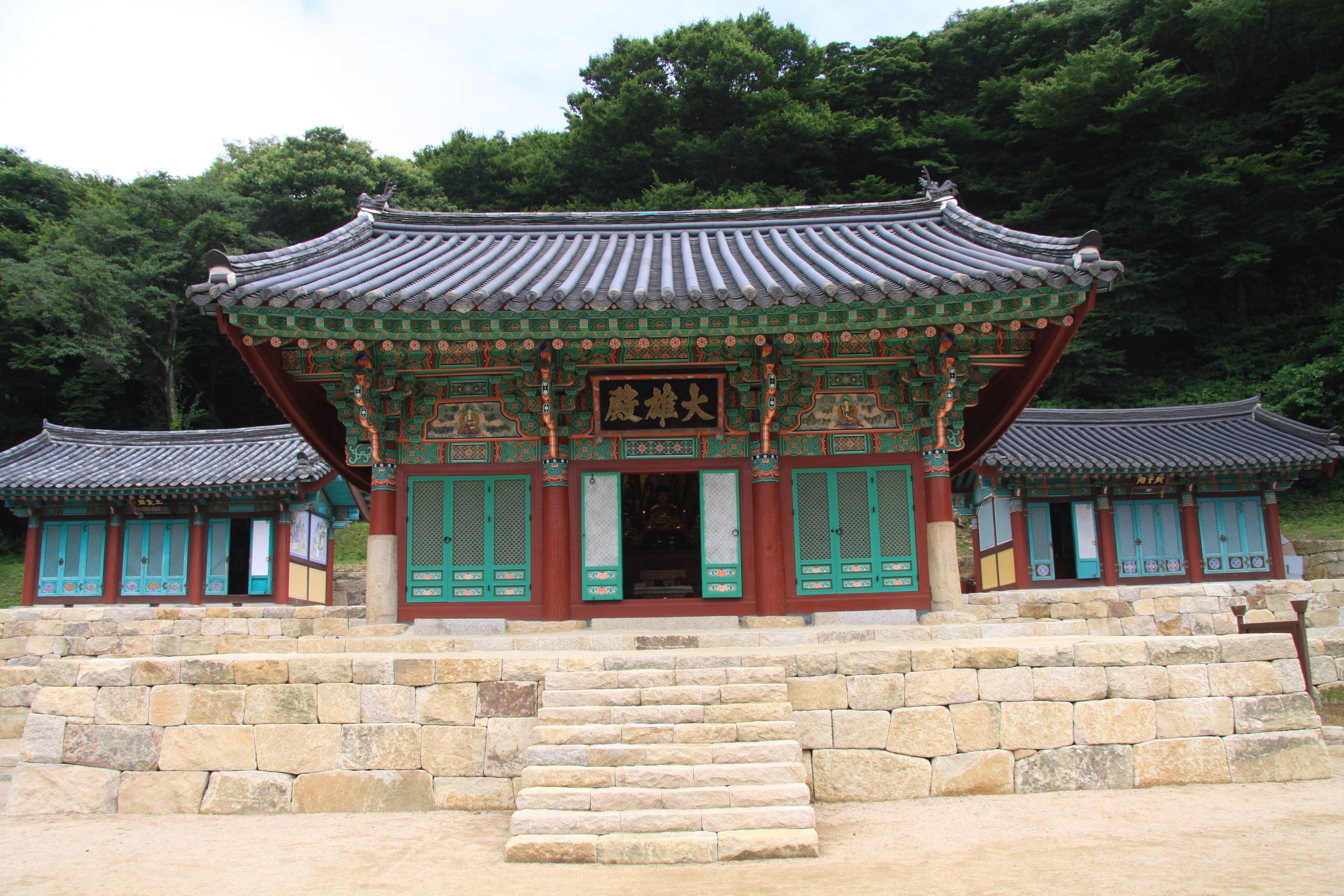
Eunsusa Daeungjeon in Busan

The building Daeungjeon at the temple Eunsusa in Busan has circular stone pillars erected at the bottom of the pillars at the corners of the pedestal to about half the height of the pillars, supporting wooden pillars.

The head and the sole are concavely processed in an arc shape at the heel, and a slightly convex base is placed under the heel. In the case of the cheomcha and salmi, the ends on both sides are decorated very ornately, and these ends are called yeonhwaduhyeong (연화두형, lotus head type) because they are carved in the shape of lotus buds.

There is a difference in the carving between the cheomcha of the main eaves architecture and those of the dapo (다포) architecture. The number of spires used in the jusimpo architecture is significantly smaller than that of the dapo architecture, so each spire is carved ornately, whereas this is not the case in the dapo architecture.

== History ==
As a traditional architecture of the late Goryeo Dynasty, It showed various structural forms, but it began to unify into a certain form around the 16th century.

Jusimpo was widely applied in the Busan area, where typhoons are frequent and there is more rain than inland areas. Construction of Eunsusa Daeungjeon began in 1647 and was completed in 1655. It is a building with a gable roof and a central sash.
