= Tapsa =

Temple

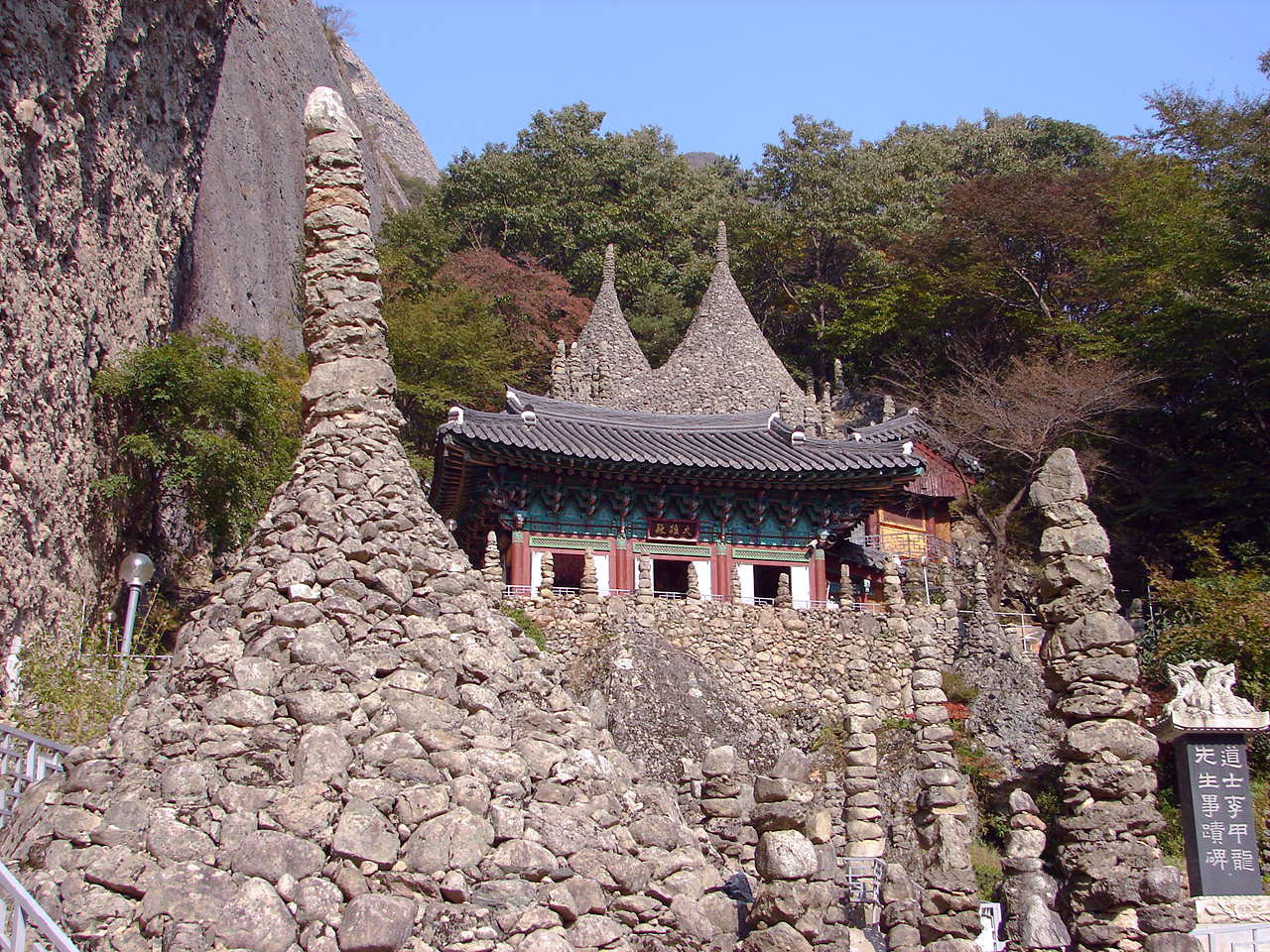
- Tapsa (Buddhist Temple) and the Stone Pagodas of Maisan (Horse Ear Mountain)

- Location within South Korea

Religion
- Affiliation: Buddhism
- District: Jinan County

Location
- State: North Jeolla Province
- Country: South Korea
- Coordinates: 35°45′30″N 127°24′40″E

Korean name
- Hangul: 탑사
- Hanja: 塔寺
- RR: Tapsa
- MR: T'apsa

Tapsa (Pagoda Temple) and the Stone Pagodas of Mount Mai is a small Korean Buddhist Temple complex found in the Maisan (Horse Ear Mountain) in Jinan County, North Jeolla Province, South Korea.

== Origins ==
In 1885 a lone Buddhist hermit layman Yi Gap Yong (1860–1957), at the age 25, came to Maisan to meditate and cultivate himself. Over the next 30 years Yi Gap Yong constructed, single handed, as many as 120 conical natural stone pagodas, all without mortar.

== Construction ==
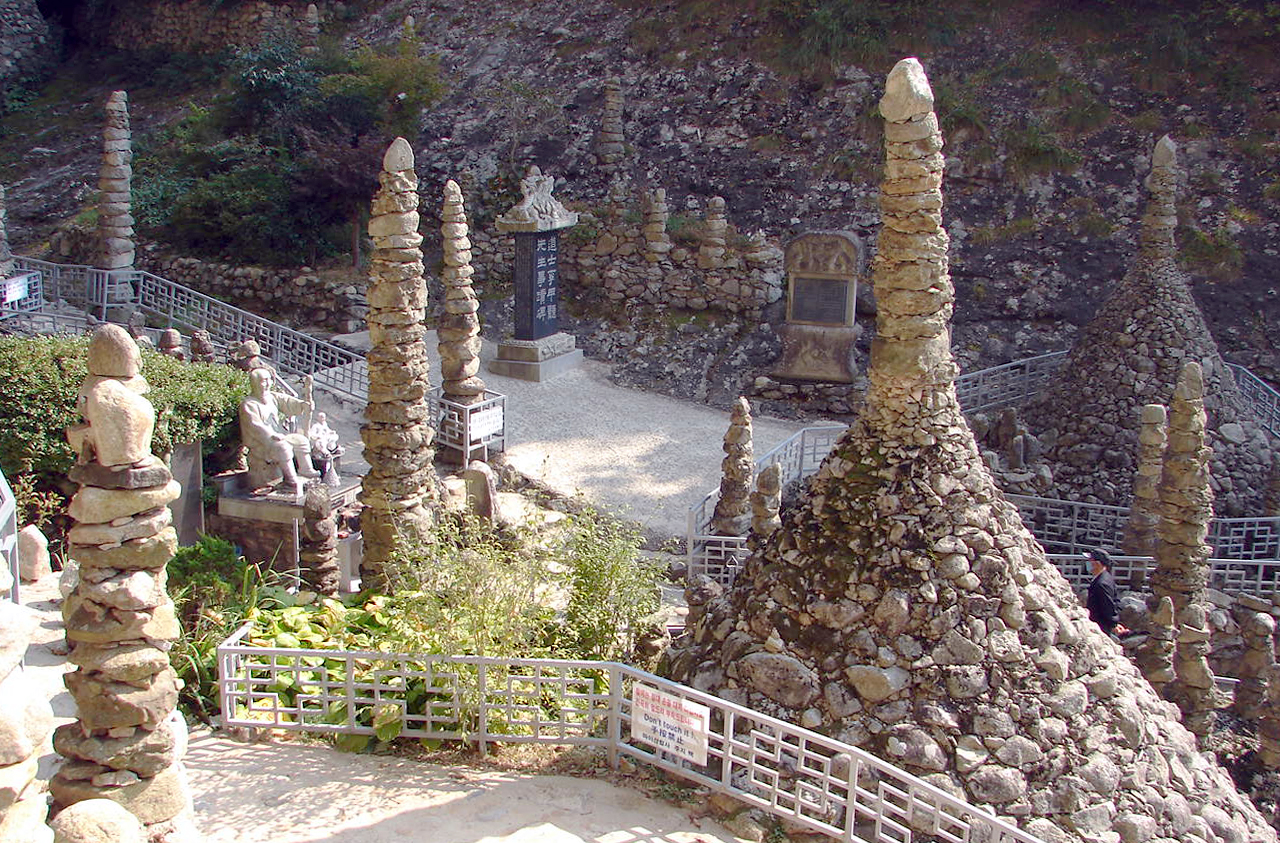
Statue of Yi Gap Yong among the stone pagodas

Extracted from www.channelnewsasia.com: Yi Gap Yong constructed the stone pagodas here incorporating the eight progressive positions of Zhuge Liang. Using this method, stones are first laid in a circular configuration before placing additional stones inside this circle. More stones are then placed in position to form a conical pyramid.

This structure is next topped off with a flat-shaped stone. To complete the pagoda another flat stone, in a yin and yang order, is added over and over until the desired shape and height of the tower is achieved.

Small pebbles are placed in the gaps between the larger stones to make the tower more stable.

Yi Gap Yong piled all of the stones, one by one, without the aid of mechanical devices or assistance. The stones for the smaller pagodas were all obtained locally but many for the larger pagodas, which can reach as high as 9m/30 ft, were gathered from the streams, rivers and mountains throughout Korea to assure their harmony with their spiritual energy.

== Temple today ==
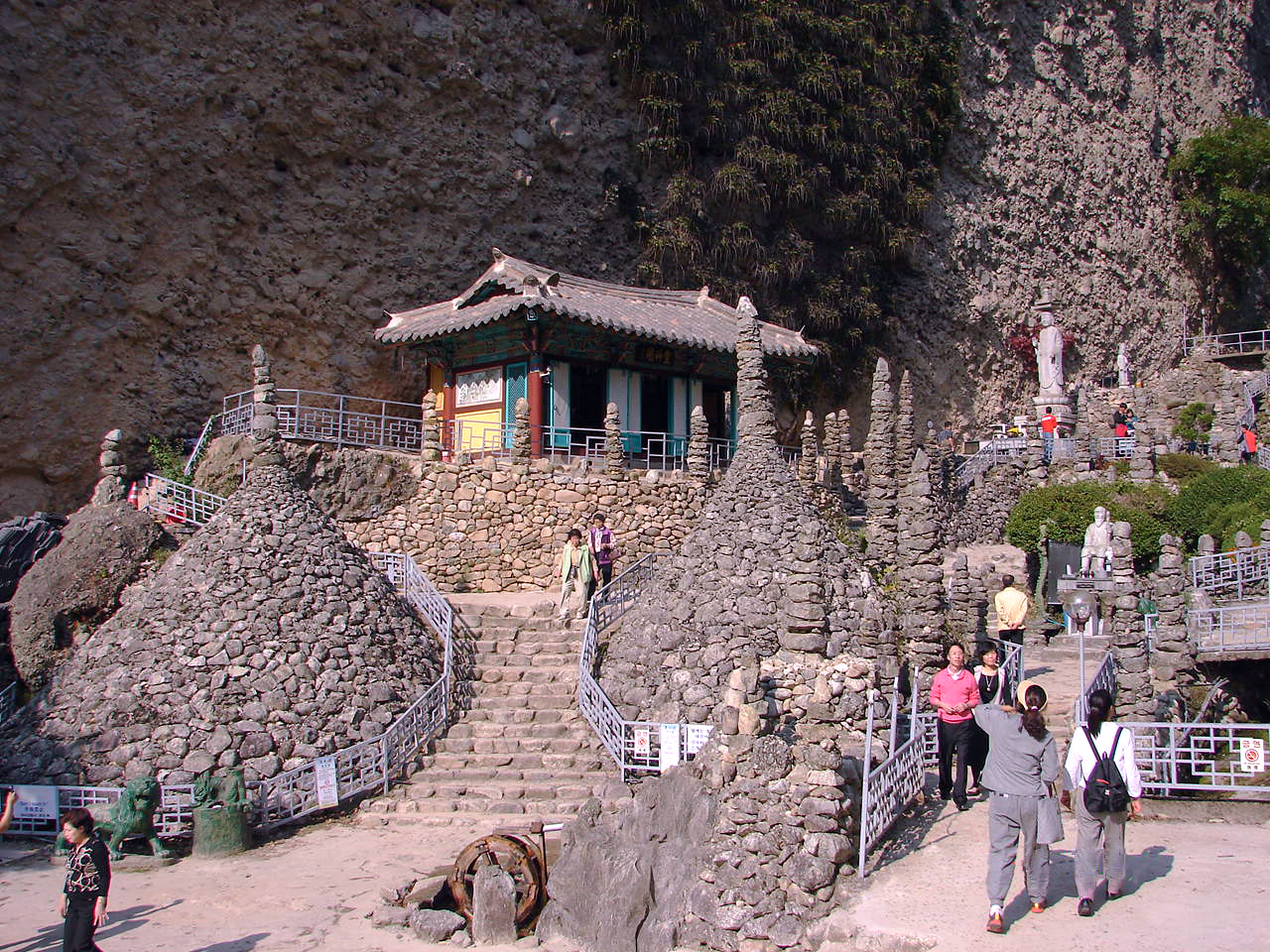
Visitors stroll through the Tapsa Temple grounds

The Tapsa Temple complex is found on Maisan (Horse Ear Mountain) under the cliff, south of Maibong (peak) within the Maisan Provincial Park complex, where today there remains at least 80 of Yi Gap Yong's Pagodas.

"Bizarre" is a term often used to describe the appearance of the somewhat alien looking landscape. The style of the stone pagodas found here is very unusual and quite different from that of the stone pagodas, typical of the Silla era, that employed fine stone cutting techniques. It is this unusual appearance that draws so many visitors to Tapsa each year.

Many years after Yi Gap Yong started his project the site became a Buddhist Temple and Yi became an ordained monk. A white statue of Yi Gap Yong, holding a wooden walking stick, rests comfortably at the foot of his temple complex.

Visitors to Maisan Provincial Park frequently visit Eunsusa (Buddhist Temple) and/or Geumdangsa (Buddhist Temple) on the way to, or from, the better known Tapsa that lies between these two temples on the path through the park.

=== Pagodas ===
- Ohbangtap (Five Directions Pagoda)
- Yaksatap (A God of Good Health Pagoda)
- Walgwangtap (Moon Light Pagoda)
- Ilgwangtap (Sun Light Pagoda)
- Chungangtap (Center Rocking One Pagoda)
  - Shinjangtap (God of Defense Pagoda) minor pagodas - many which surround and protect the major pagodas

=== Buildings and Structures ===
- Daeungjeon (Main sanctuary or worship hall)
- Sansingak (Hall for the Mountain Gods)
- Youngsingak (Hall for Rites)
- Jonggak (Bell Pavilion)
- Mirukbul (Maitreya Buddha Statue)
- Temple dormitory for monks

== Gallery ==
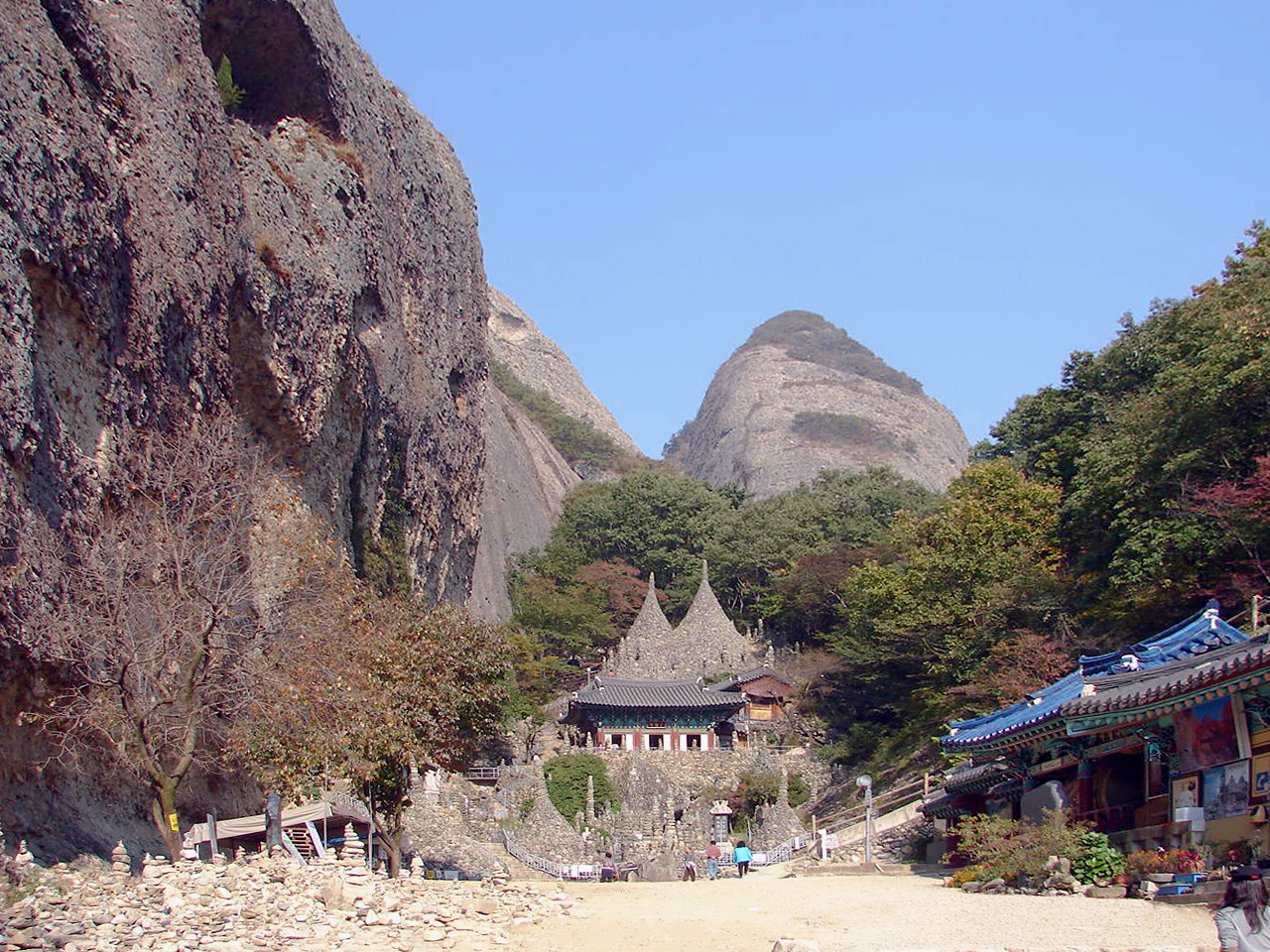

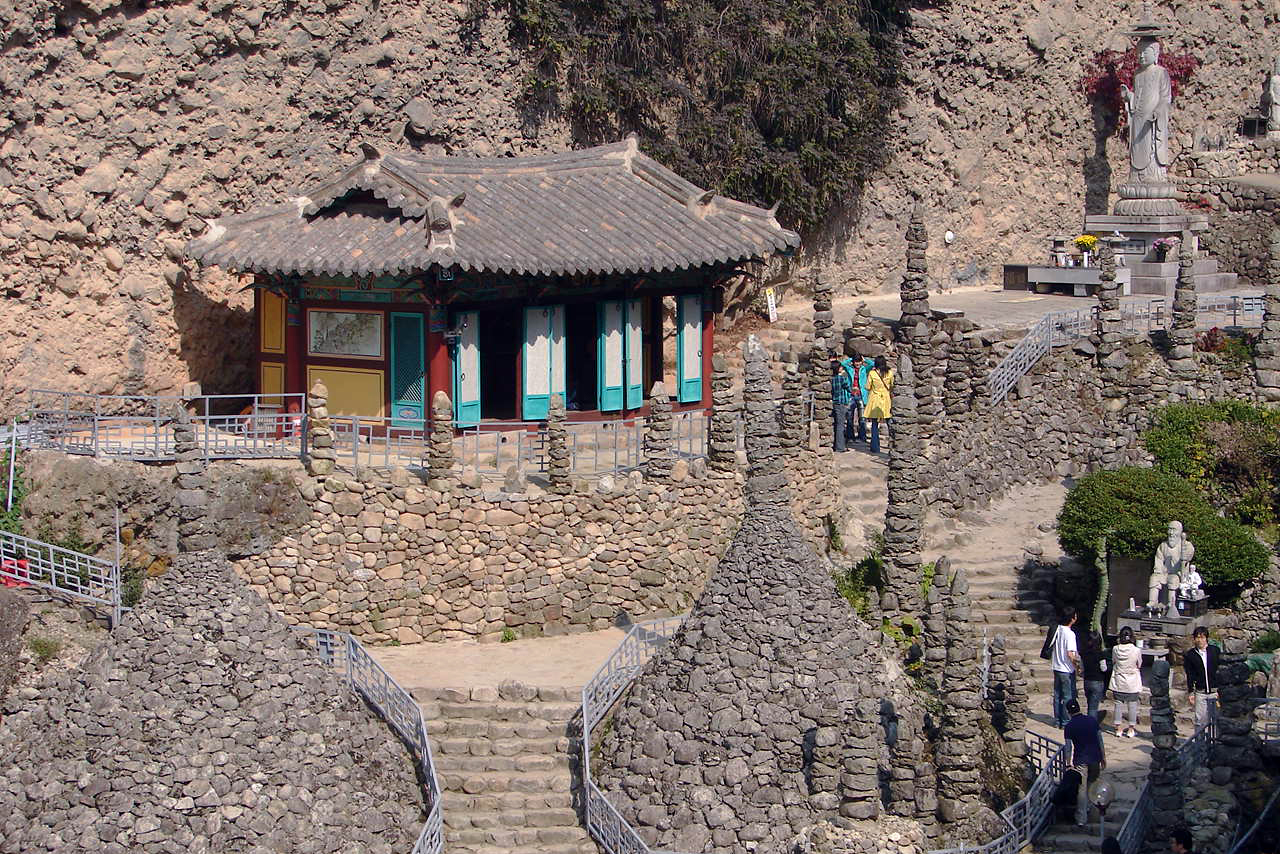

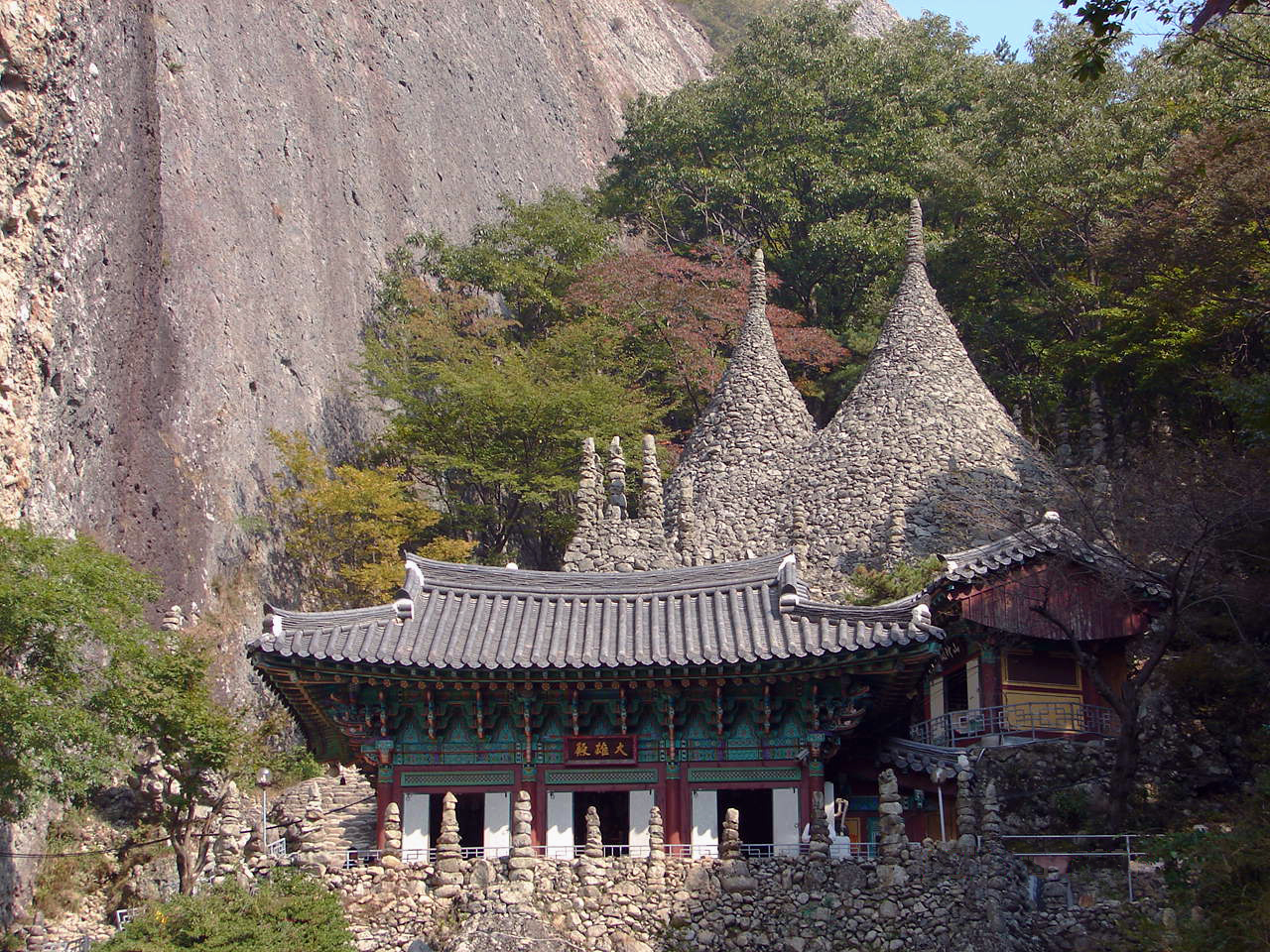

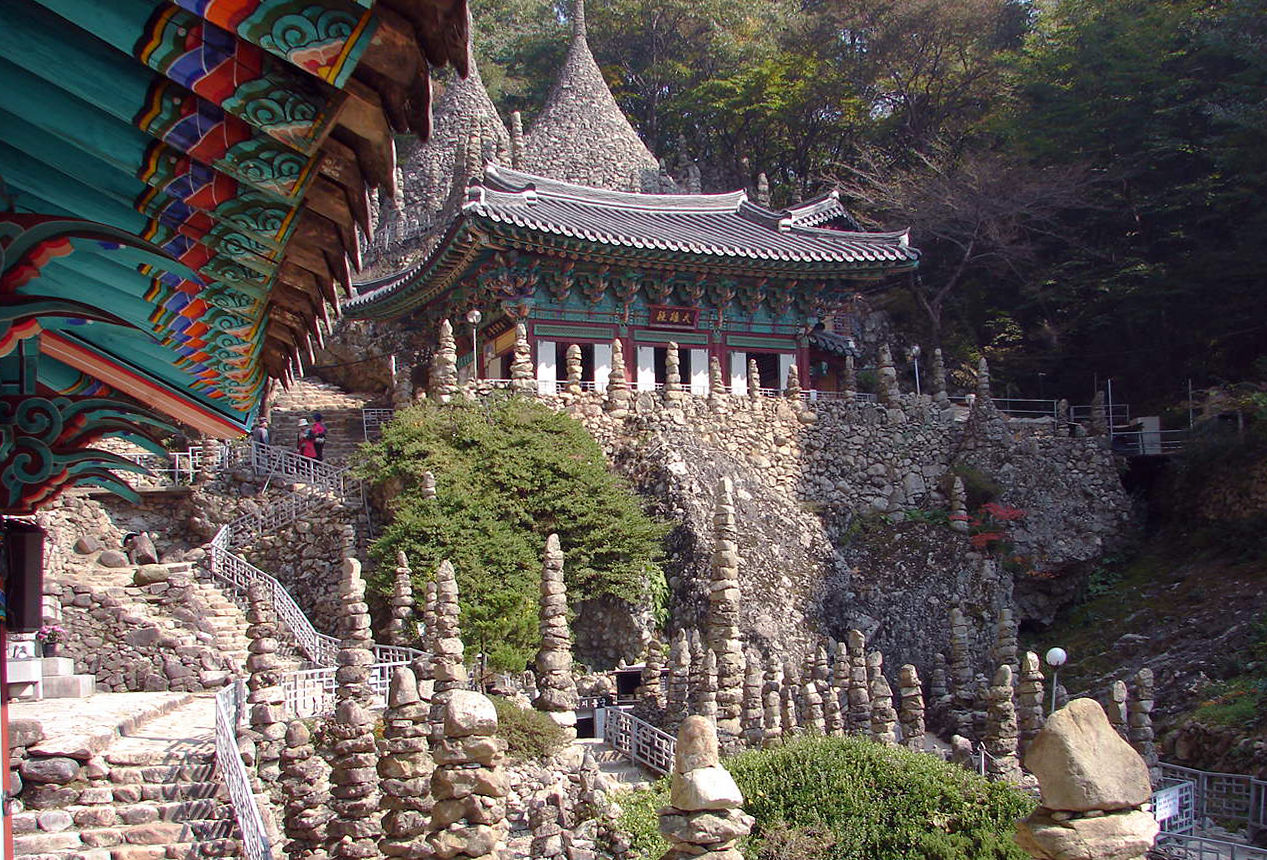
