= Geumdangsa =

Buddhist temple in Jinan, South Korea

Geumdang Temple
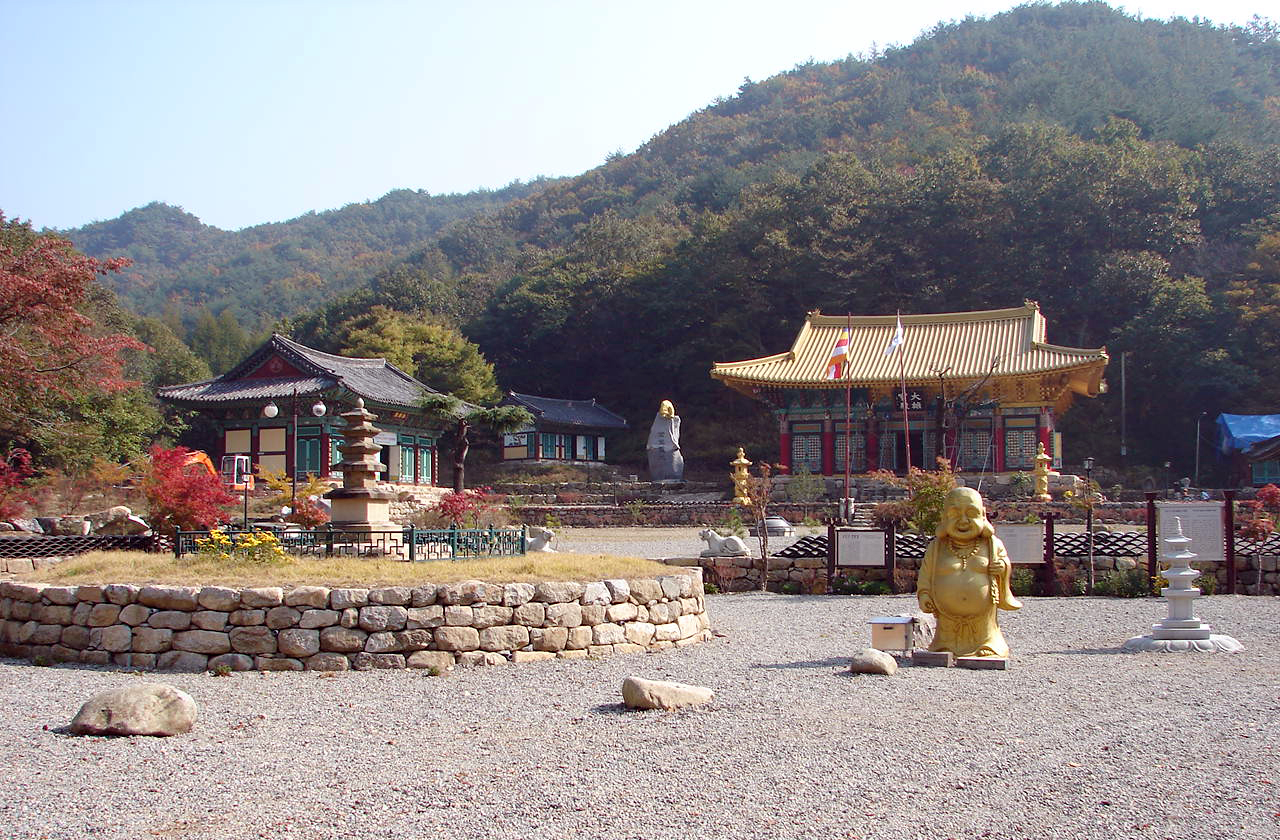

- Location within South Korea

Religion
- Affiliation: Buddhism

Location
- Location: Dongchon-ri, Maryeong-myeon, Jinan County, North Jeolla Province
- Country: South Korea
- Coordinates: 35.7578662°N 127.3971713°E

Korean name
- Hangul: 금당사
- Hanja: 金塘寺
- RR: Geumdangsa
- MR: Kŭmdangsa

Geumdangsa or Geumdang Temple is a South Korean Buddhist temple in the Maisan (Horse Ear Mountain) in Jinan County, North Jeolla Province, South Korea.

Maisan (Horse Ear Mountain) is part of the Maisan Provincial Park complex and visitors to the park frequently visit Geumdangsa on the way to, or from, the better known Tapsa (Pagoda Temple) that lies to the northeast, up the path through the park.

Further up the path, past Lake Tapyeongje and Tapsa, is found the small temple of Eunsusa in the park as well.

== Origin ==
Geumdangsa was built in 814 during the reign of King Heondeok of the Silla dynasty (57 BCE – 935 CE) and is known as the place where the Goryeo monk Naong Hwasang practiced his form of asceticism. According to another account, the daughter of General Jeon Bong-jun, who led the anti-establishment and anti-foreigner campaign Donghak Peasant Revolution in 1894, sought refuge here.

The temple also served as a base for guerrilla troops in the Jinan area during the Japanese colonial period.

== Treasures ==
=== Tangible Cultural Properties #18 ===
Geumdangsamokbuljwasang (Seated Buddha statue in Geumdangsa Temple). This Amitabha Buddha is believed to have been first built during the Unified Silla period (668–935).

The gentle facial expression and the plumpness of the body indicates that this image is likely from around 1675. The square face, the smaller shoulders, and the simple style of the robes are typical of Buddhist images of the late Joseon period (1392–1910).

=== Cultural Properties Materials #122 ===
Geumdangsaseoktap (Stone Pagoda of Geumdang Temple)

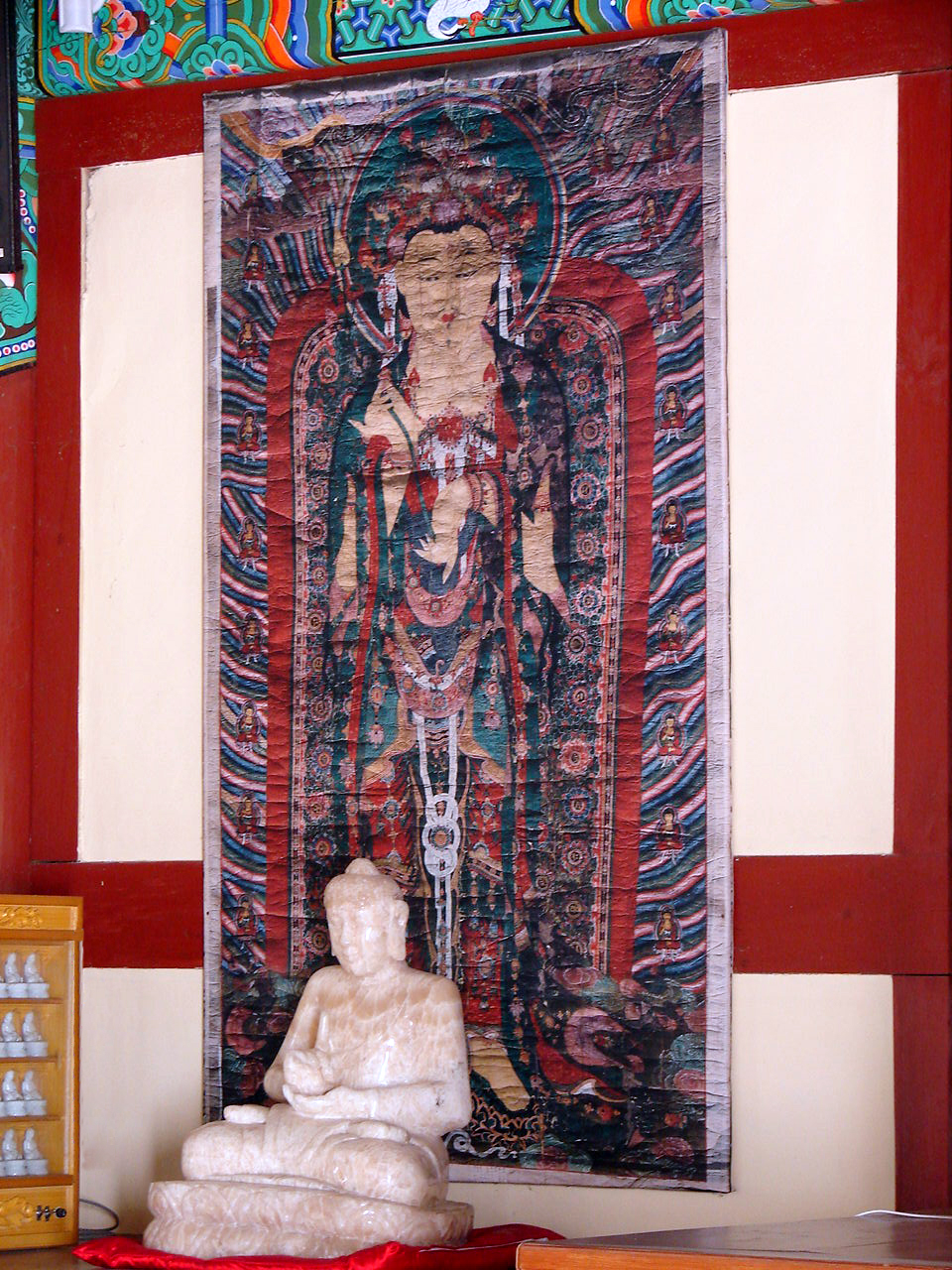
Gwaneumbodhisavtta painted in 1686. Monks would conduct prayer rituals appealing for rain in the presence of the painting. Treasure #1266

=== Treasure #1266 ===
Geumdangsa houses the hanging painting of the Avalokitesvara Bodhisattva (Gwaneumbodhisavtta). This painting is a representative example of a hanging Buddhist painting, measuring 9 meters/30 feet high and 5 meters/16.4 feet wide.

Gwaneumbodhisavtta was painted by 3 artists in the 12th year of King Sukjong in the Joseon dynasty (1686).

Gwaneumbodhisavtta is adorned with a coronet decorated with several Buddha faces over lotus blossoms, surrounded by phoenixes on the left and right sides. Gwaneumbodhisavtta's form is depicted as small with a very large face when compared to the proportions of the body.

It is adorned with decorated robes and ornaments, patterns. Scarlet is the main color with the use of the greens, pinks and white colors producing the warm and soothing aura of the painting.

Surrounding Gwaeumbodhisavtta on the left and right are rows of brightly colored flame-shaped patterns incorporating 20 small Buddhist gods.

Gwaneumbodhisavtta is depicted with hands holding branches of a Yonghwasu tree.

In the past whenever there was an extended drought in the area, the Geumdangsa monks would conduct prayer rituals appealing for rain in the presence of the painting, which invariably resulted in rainfall shortly thereafter.

== Gallery ==
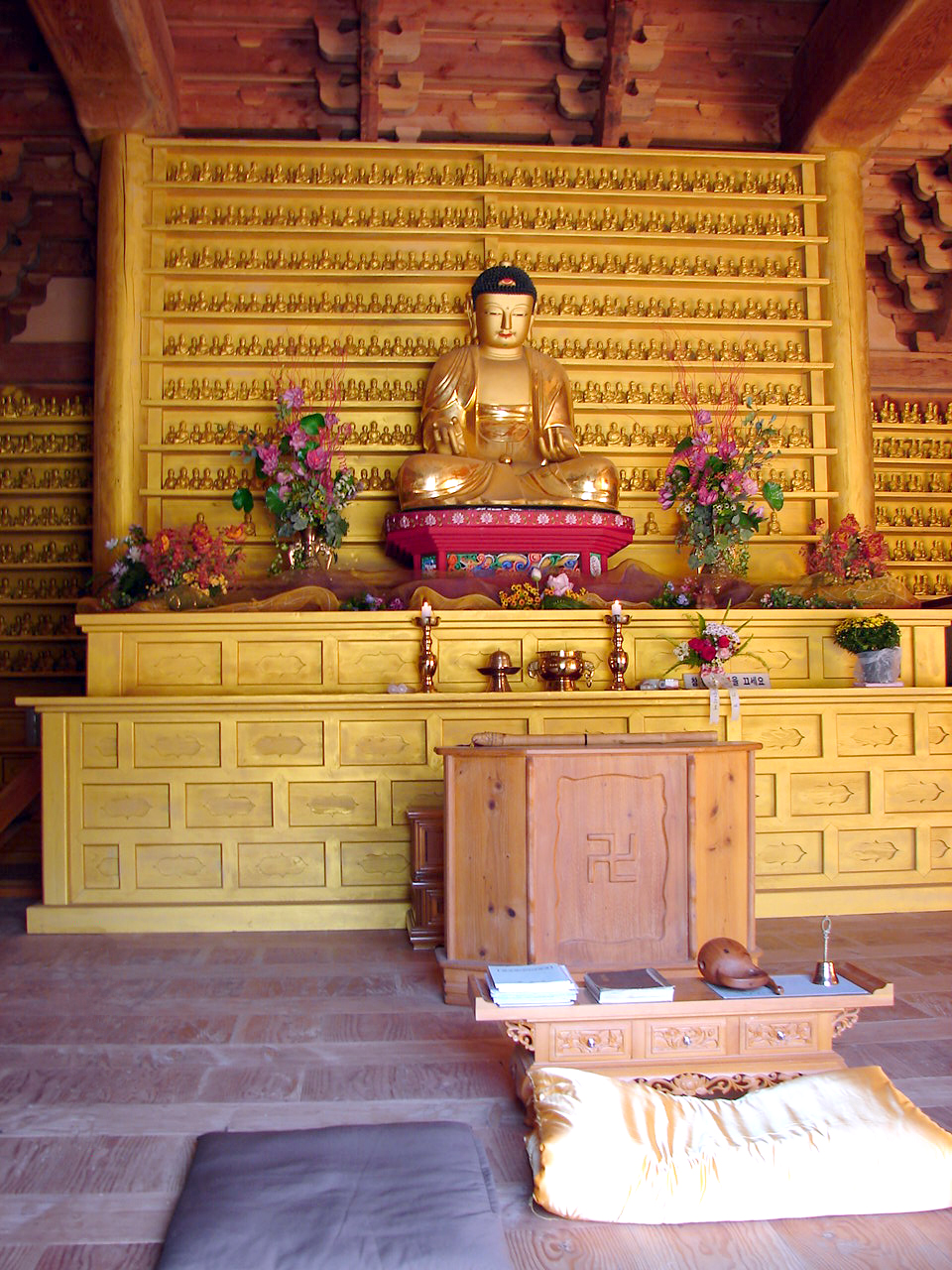
Geumdangsamokbuljwasang (Seated Buddha statue in Geumdangsa Temple). Tangible Cultural Properties #18.

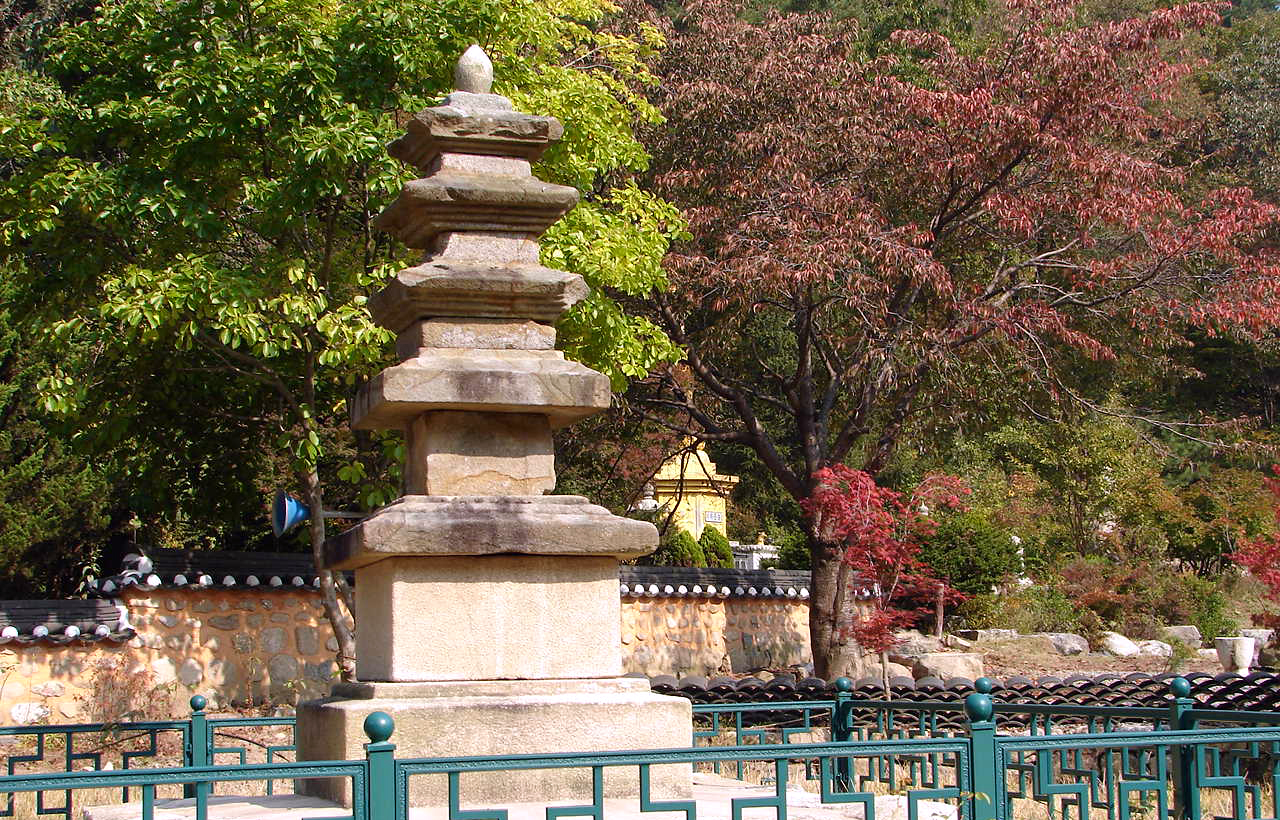
Geumdangsaseoktap (Stone Pagoda of Geumdang Temple). Cultural Properties Materials #122.

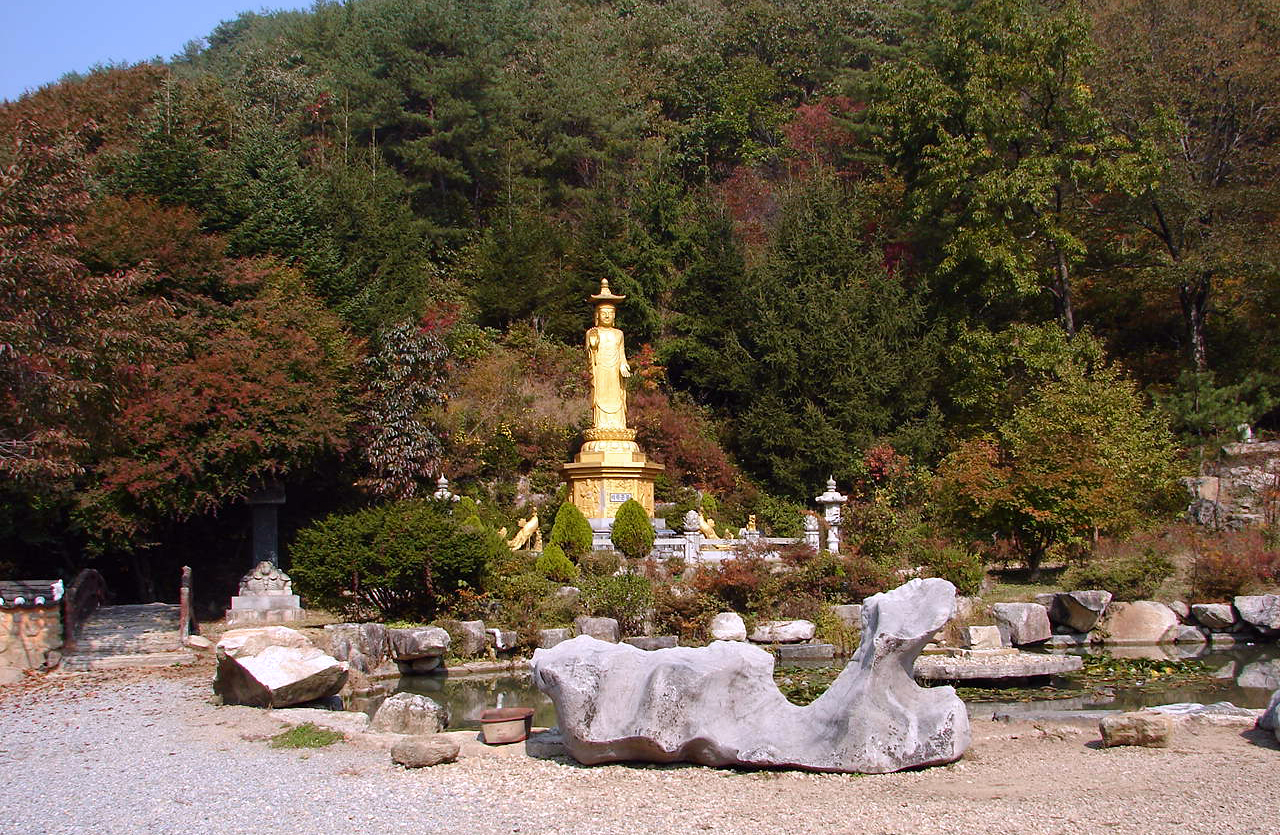
Geumdangsa in the Maisan (Horse Ear Mountain)

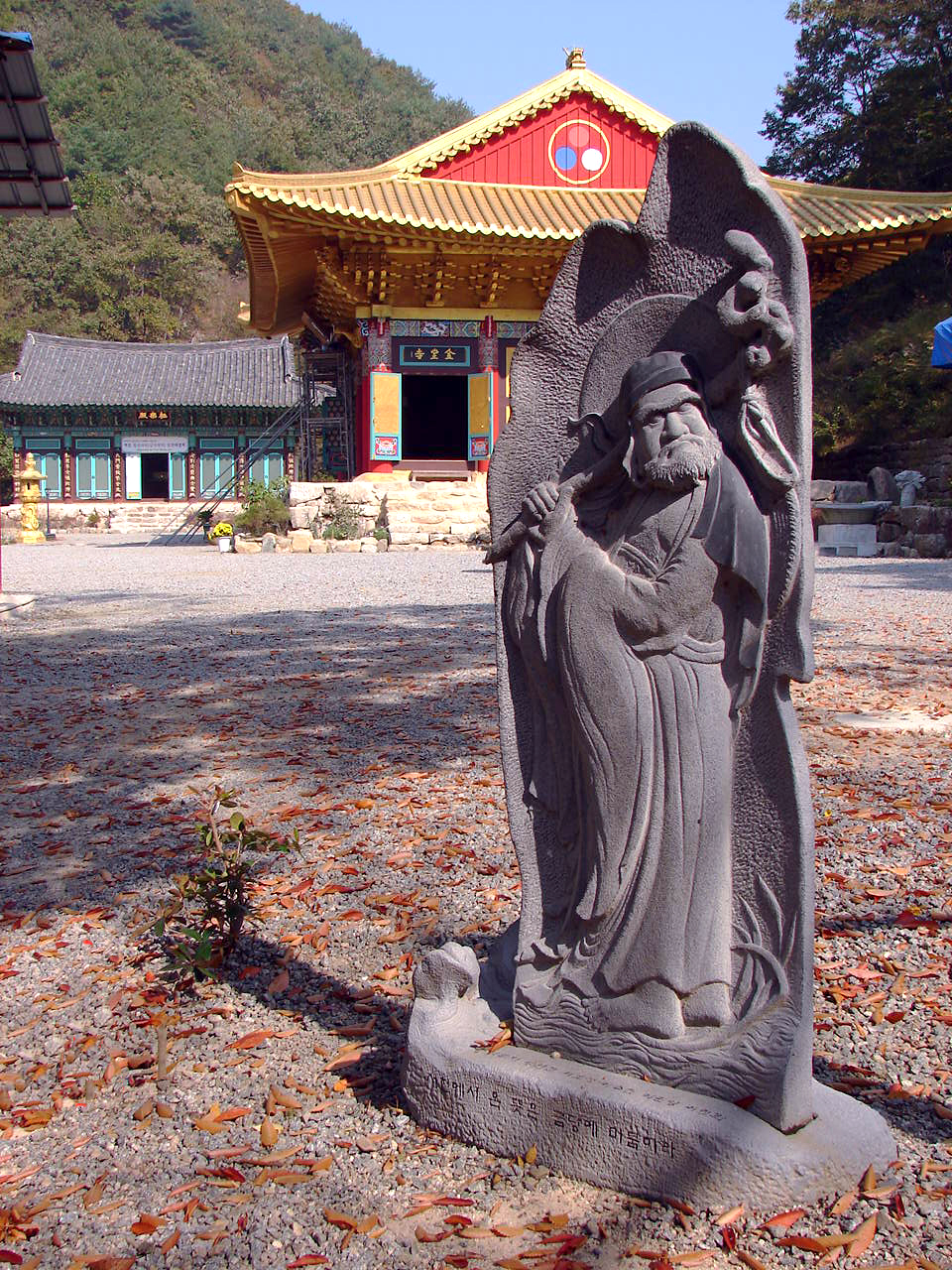
Geumdangsa in the Maisan (Horse Ear Mountain)

== See also ==
- Maisan
- Geumsansa
