= Hwasun County =

Hwasun
- County
- Panoramic view of Hwasun-eup

- Flag Emblem of Hwasun
- Anthem: Song of Citizens of Hwasun County
- Location in South Korea
- Country: South Korea
- Region: Honam
- Provincial-level city: Jeonnam-Gwangju
- Administrative divisions: 1 eup, 12 myeon

Area
  - Total: 786.23 km^{2} (303.57 sq mi)

Population (September 2024)
  - Total: 60,886
  - Density: 100/km^{2} (260/sq mi)
  - Dialect: Jeolla

Korean name
- Hangul: 화순군
- Hanja: 和順郡
- RR: Hwasun-gun
- MR: Hwasun-gun

Hwasun County (Korean: 화순군) is a county in Jeonnam-Gwangju, South Korea.

== Symbol ==
- County Flower : Wild Chrysanthemum
- County Tree : Zelkova Tree
- County Bird : Dove

== History ==
Before Hwasun became an administrative community in the Japanese Empire, individual culture was formed along three rivers: Jiseokcheon River to Neungju, Hwasuncheon River to Hwasun, and Dongbokcheon River to Dongbok. Recently, residential remains from the Stone Age and the Mesolithic were found in Juam Dam (on the river Gapcheon) at Daejeon Village, Sasu-ri, Nam-myeon. Bronze Age remains include 1,180 dolmens; and a variety of remains excavated in a stone-lines tomb at Daegok-ri (including National Tresture No. 143, bronze knife and bronze mirror). A pit-tomb from the Baekje Period was found at the site of Unjusa Temple.

== Culture and Tourism ==
- Red Cliff (赤壁)
- Unjusa (云 住 寺)
- Ssangbongsa (双峰 寺)
- Mudeungsan (无 等 山)
- Towon Academy (道 源 书院)
- Hwasun Nongak Hanchun (和顺 寒泉 农 乐)

== World Heritages ==
A dolmen is a grave at the prehistoric age and a kind of megalithic monument. It is distributed all over the world and Korea is its center. There are about 19,000 only in Jeonnam. Hwasun is a representative center of dolmen and has about 2,000. Since 1988, the dolmen in Hwasun was designated as cultural asset.

Present situation of Dolmens

- Designation: Historic Relic No. 410 (Designated on September 17, 1998)
- Address: Hoysan-ri, Dogok-myeon ~ Daesin-ri, Chunyang-myeon, Hwasun-gun
- Designated area: 2,191,767 m^{2} (about 663,000 pyeong)
- Quantity: Daesin-ri, Chunyang - 319 Hyosan-ri, Dogok - 277 Total 596

=== Features of Hwasun Dolmen ===
Collective tight formation in a small area. Tens of dolmens have 100-ton upper stone in weight. There are extra-large dolmens of 280 tons. A quarry remains to show the process of building dolmens. Dolmens of Hwasun, 34.9775414°N 126.931551°E were registered with those of Ganghwa and Gochang county.

== Notable people ==
- Go Hyun-Jeong, actress
- Kim Hyo-Jong, rapper

=== Historical figure ===
- Lee Han-yeol (Born: 29 August 1966, Died: 5 July 1987)
