= Dapo (bracket style) =

Bracket style in Korean architecture

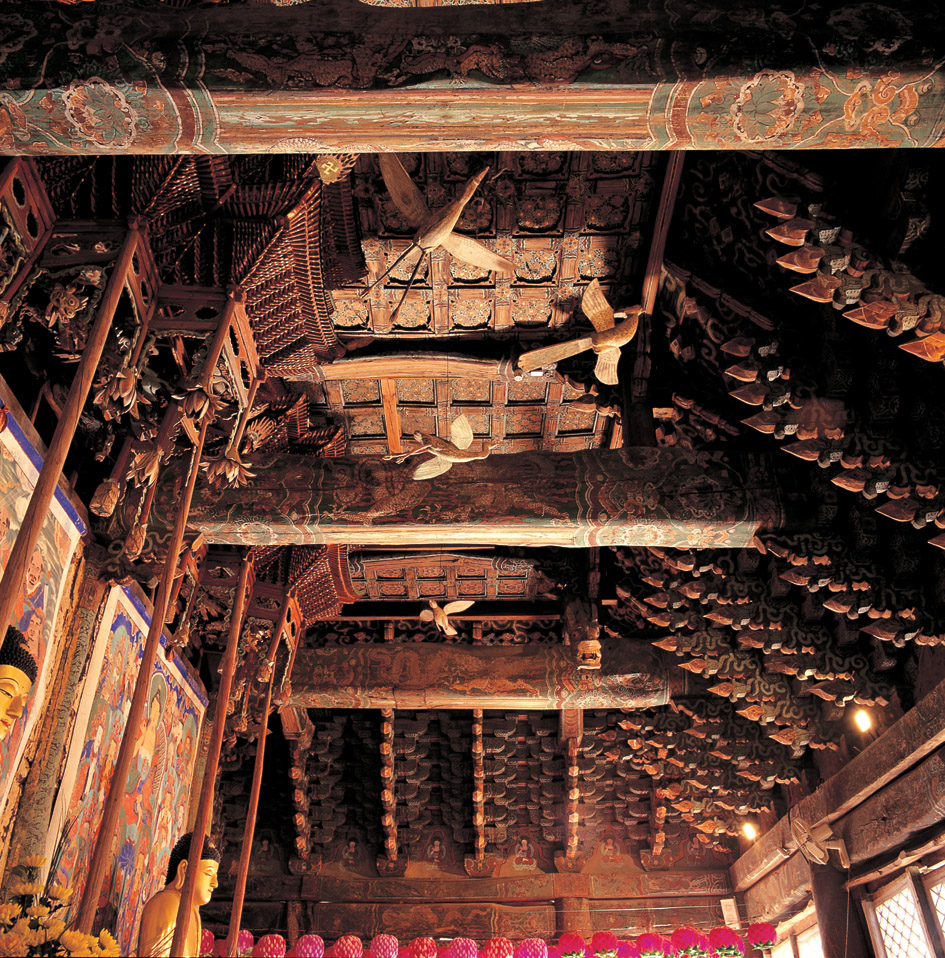
Ssanggyesa Daeungjeon (Nonsan, South Chungcheong Province)

Dapo (Korean: 다포) is a style of bracket in traditional Korean architecture that is installed not only on the top of a column but also on the top between columns, which is a combination of a column head, a bracket, a spire, a bracket, and other structural members.

== Overview ==
Unlike the jusimpo (주심포) style, which only supports the outer purlins with brackets placed on top of the columnar brackets, the dapo style supports the outer purlins together with brackets placed between the columnar brackets. Therefore, the outer purlins can be supported much more efficiently, and it is effective in preventing sagging of the eaves located between the columns.

== Cheomcha ==
Unlike the jusimpo style, which has elaborate carvings on the finials, the dapo style has almost no carvings on the finials. Generally, the left and right ends are cut straight vertically, and the lower corners are rounded.

The spires of the dapo style are basically two for each projection, and only one for the outermost projection. It is classified as follows according to size.

- Lower cheomcha: socheom (소첨)
- Upper cheomcha: daecheom (대첨)

The form of the salmi of the dapo-style architecture varies depending on the era. In older dapo architecture, the ends of the iron bars were carved to extend straight down while being inclined, and in the 18th century, small flower buds began to be carved on the upper or lower parts of the iron bars. From the mid-18th century onwards, there were many cases of flowers in full bloom being carved on the upper parts of the soeseo.

== Gallery ==
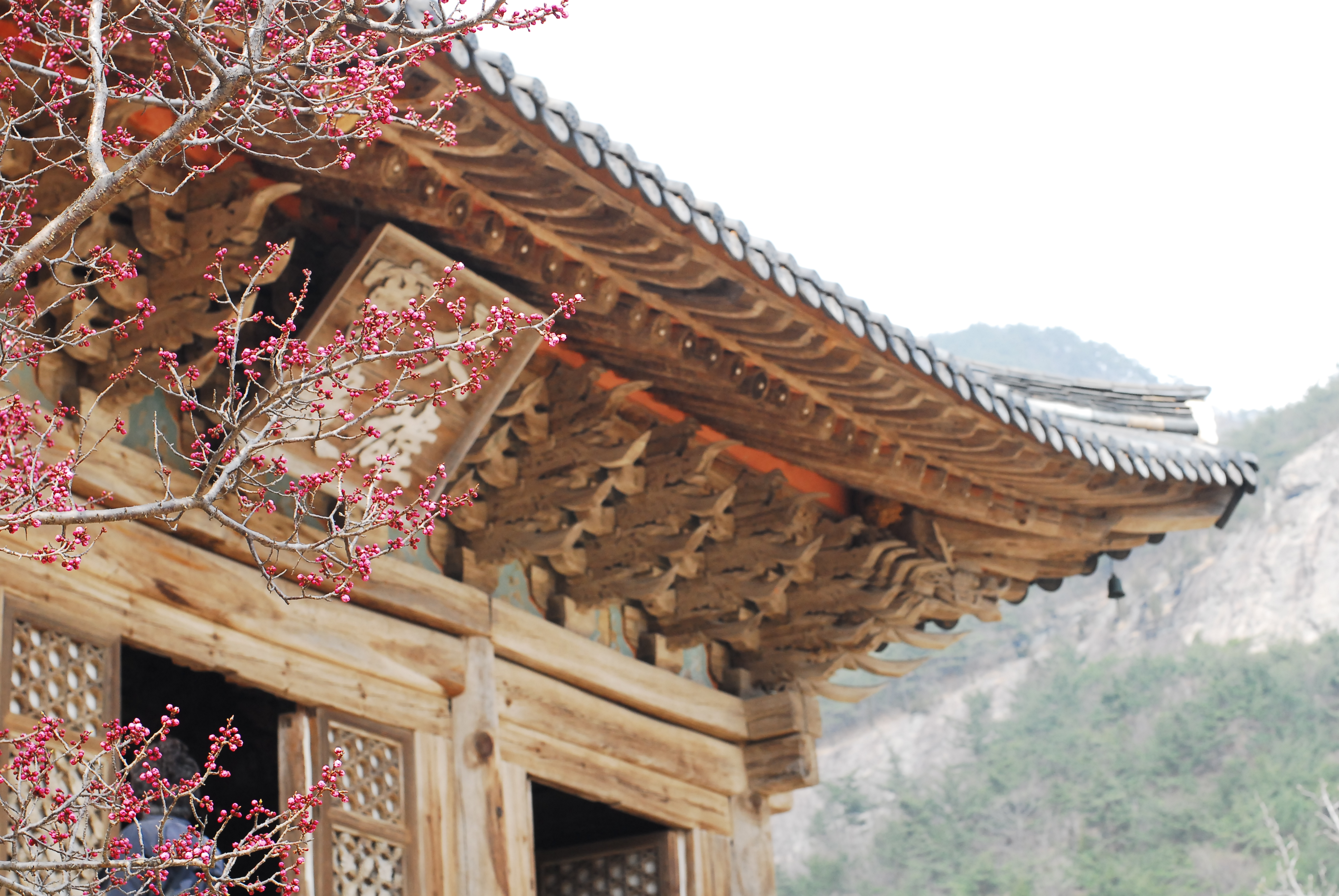
Naesosa Daeungbojeon (Buan County, South Jeolla Province)

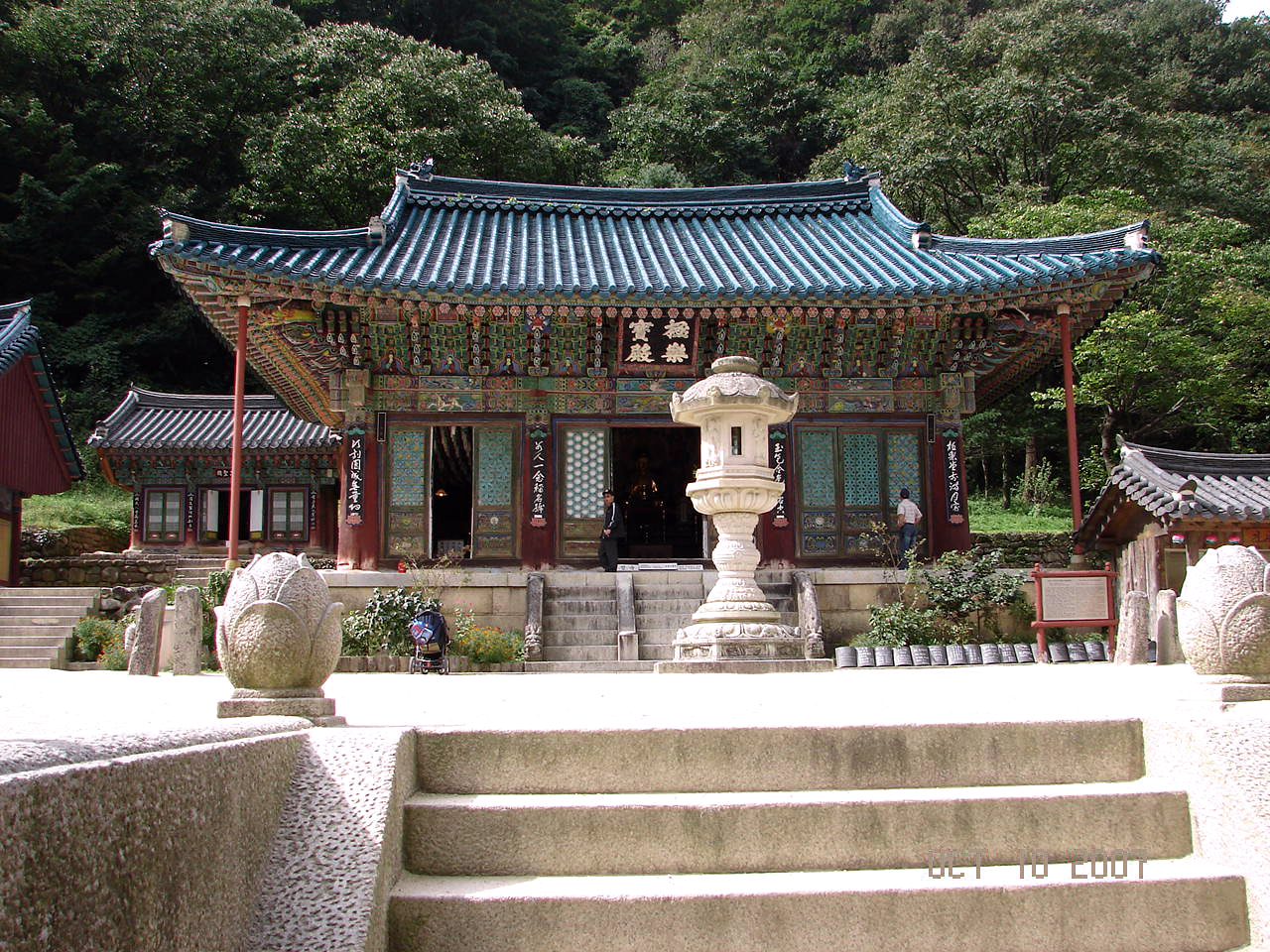
Shinheungsa (Sokcho, Gangwon Province)

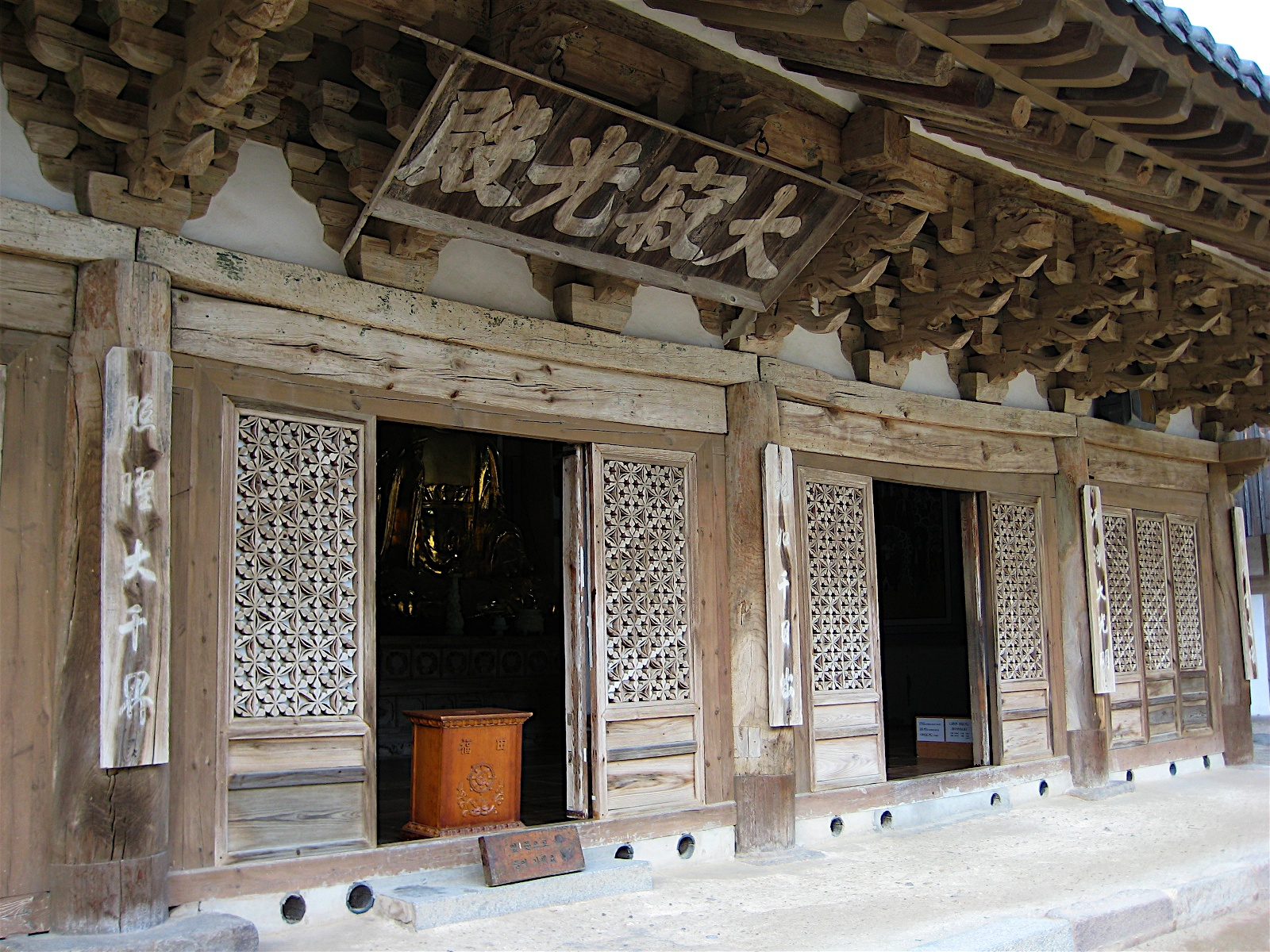
Girimsa Daejeokgwangjeon (Gyeongju, North Gyeongsang Province)

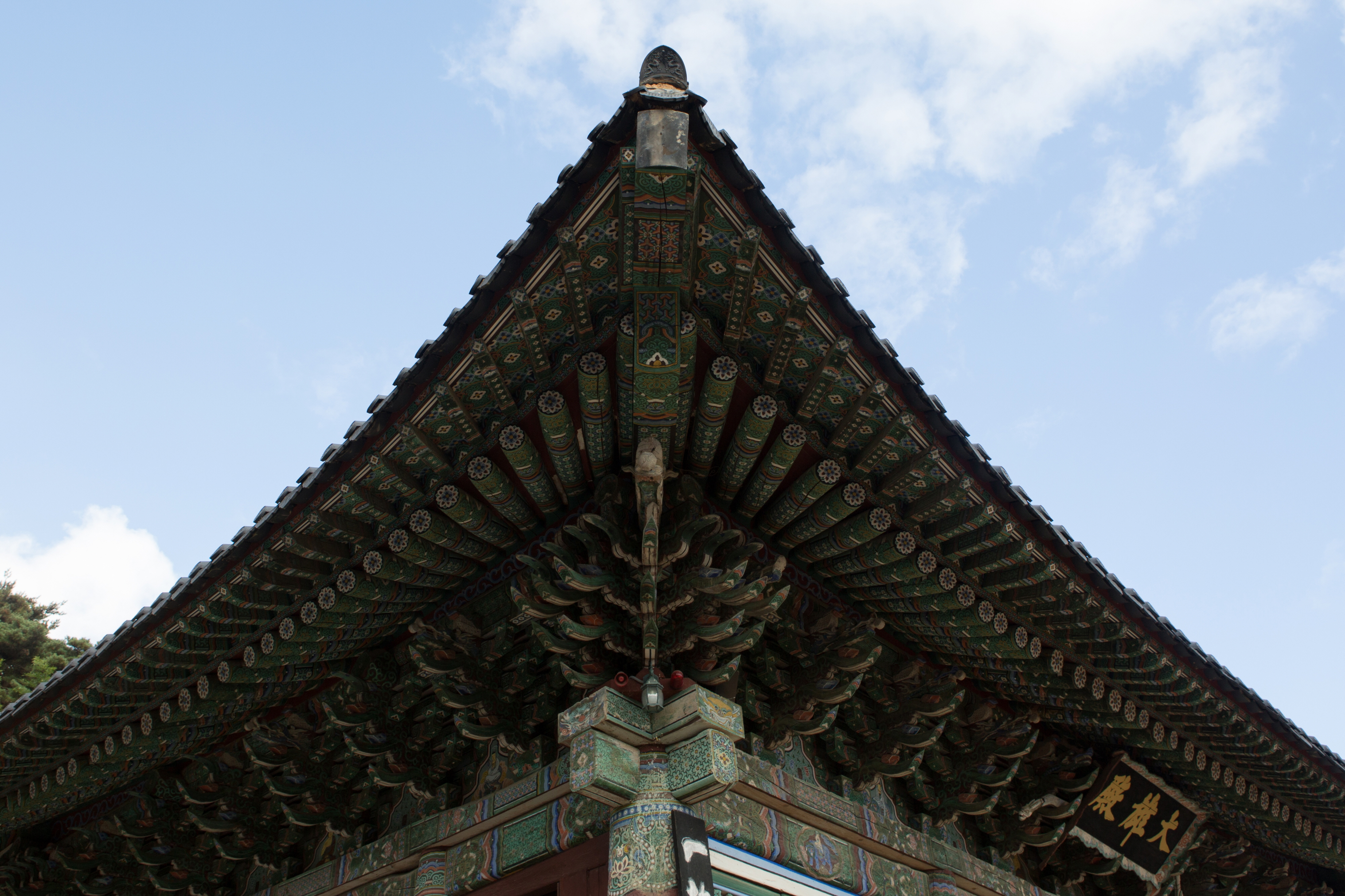
Donghwasa Daeungjeon (Daegu)
