= Eunsusa =

South Korean Buddhist temple

Eunsu Temple
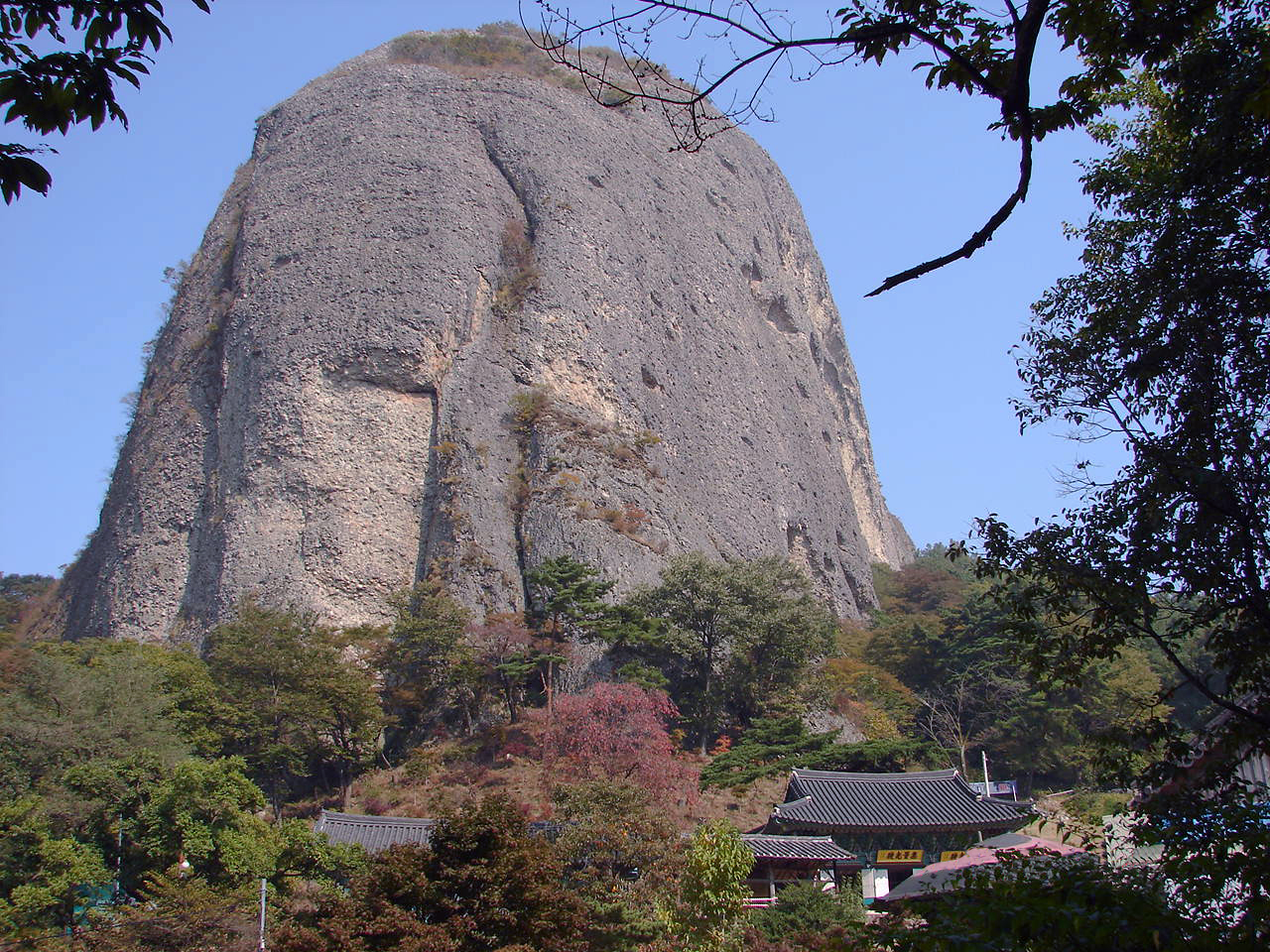
- Eunsusa is a small Buddhist Temple that sits at the base of Sutmaibong (peak), or Elephant Rock, in the Maisan (Horse Ear Mountain)

- Location within South Korea

Religion
- Affiliation: Buddhism

Location
- Location: Dongchon-ri, Maryeong-myeon, Jinan County, North Jeolla Province
- Country: South Korea
- Coordinates: 35.759503°N 127.4141765°E

Korean name
- Hangul: 은수사
- Hanja: 銀水寺
- RR: Eunsusa
- MR: Ŭnsusa

Eunsusa (literally "Silver Water Temple") is a small Korean Buddhist temple that sits at the base of Sutmaibong (peak), or Elephant Rock, in the Maisan (Horse Ear Mountain) in Jinan County, North Jeolla Province, South Korea.

In addition to Cheongsilbae - Natural Monuments #386, a shrine dedicated to Dangun Wanggeom (the legendary founder of Gojoseon, the first Korean kingdom), and a large drum that anyone can strike, can be found at Eunsusa.

Maisan (Horse Ear Mountain) is part of the Maisan Provincial Park complex and visitors to the park frequently visit Eunsusa on the way to, or from, the better known Tapsa (Pagoda Temple) that lies to the southwest, down the path through the park.

Further down the path, past Tapsa and Lake Tapyeongje, is found the small temple of Geumdangsa inside the park as well.

== Treasures ==
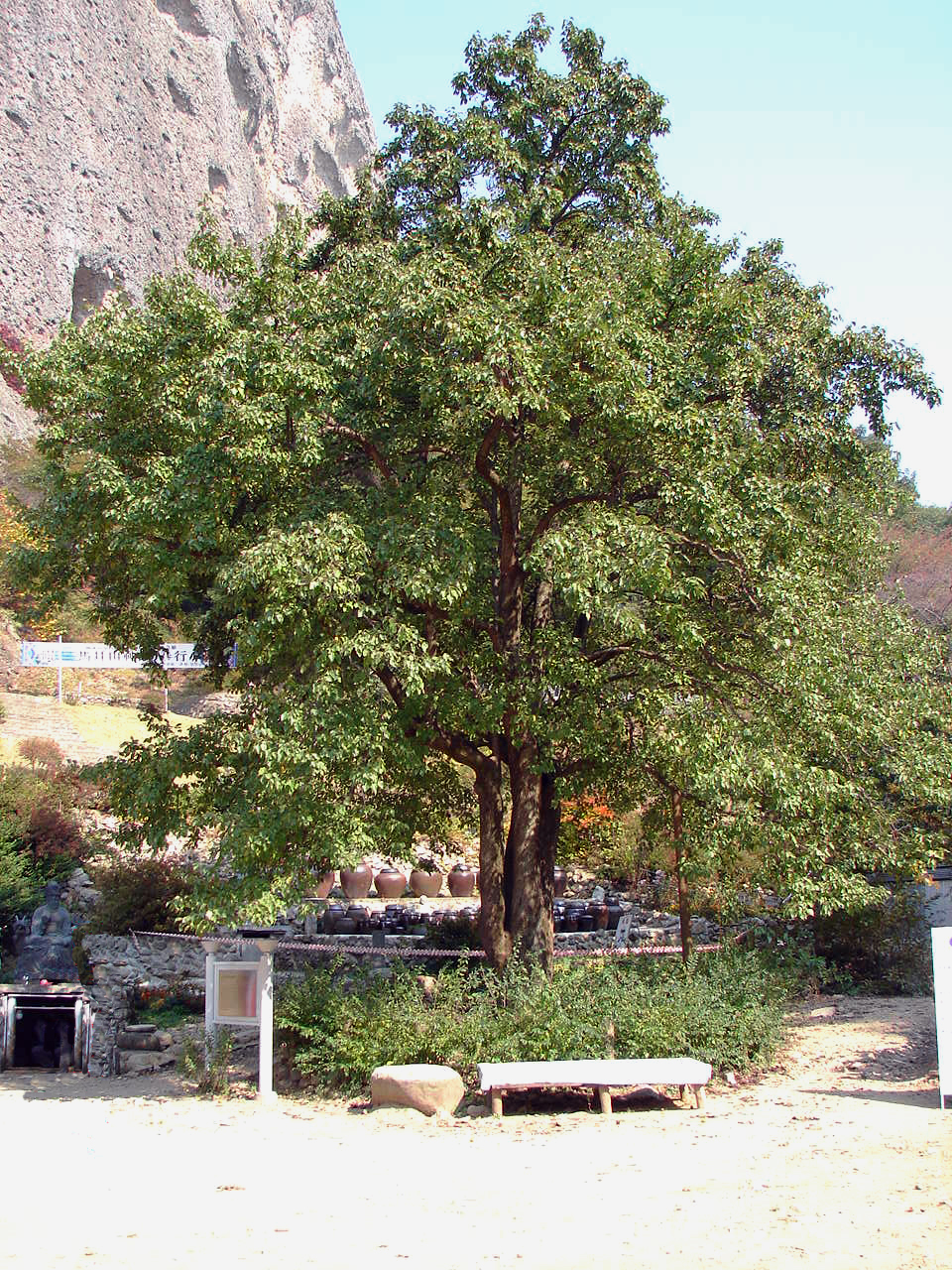
Cheongsilbae (Pear Tree) at Eunsusa. Natural Monument #386

=== Natural Monuments #386 ===
Cheongsilbae is an extremely rare pear tree species endemic to Korea known only to exist at Eunsusa.

The age of this tree at Eunsusa is believed to be about 650 years old.

Cheongsilbae stands 18 meters/59 feet in height and 2.8 meters/9.2 feet in circumference.

This variation is a blue thread colored mountain stone shaped pear tree that would grow near a house or on mountain.

The leaf is saw-toothed with an oval tip and both sides of this strongly structured leaf are smooth.

The fruit starts out brown or green in color but changes to yellow as it ripens later in the fall.

Cheongsilbae at Eunsusa was planted as a seed by Yi Seonggye, King Taejo in Joseon, at this site to commemorate where he prayed in Maisan. The local people are very proud of the legend of Cheongsilbae's origins.

Cheongsilbae is protected as, and designated as, a Natural Monument due to the scientific value and to assure preservation of species.

== Gallery ==
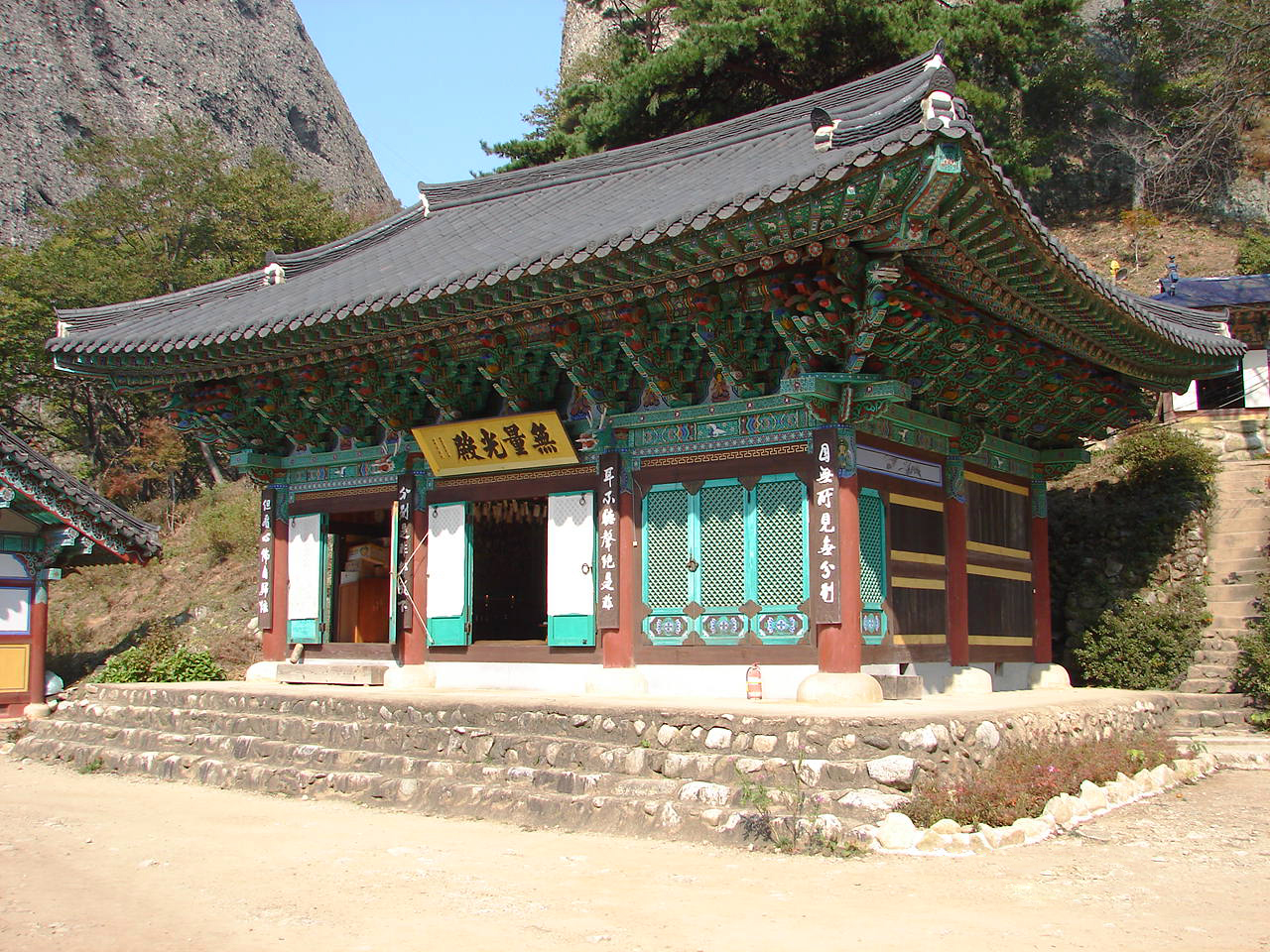

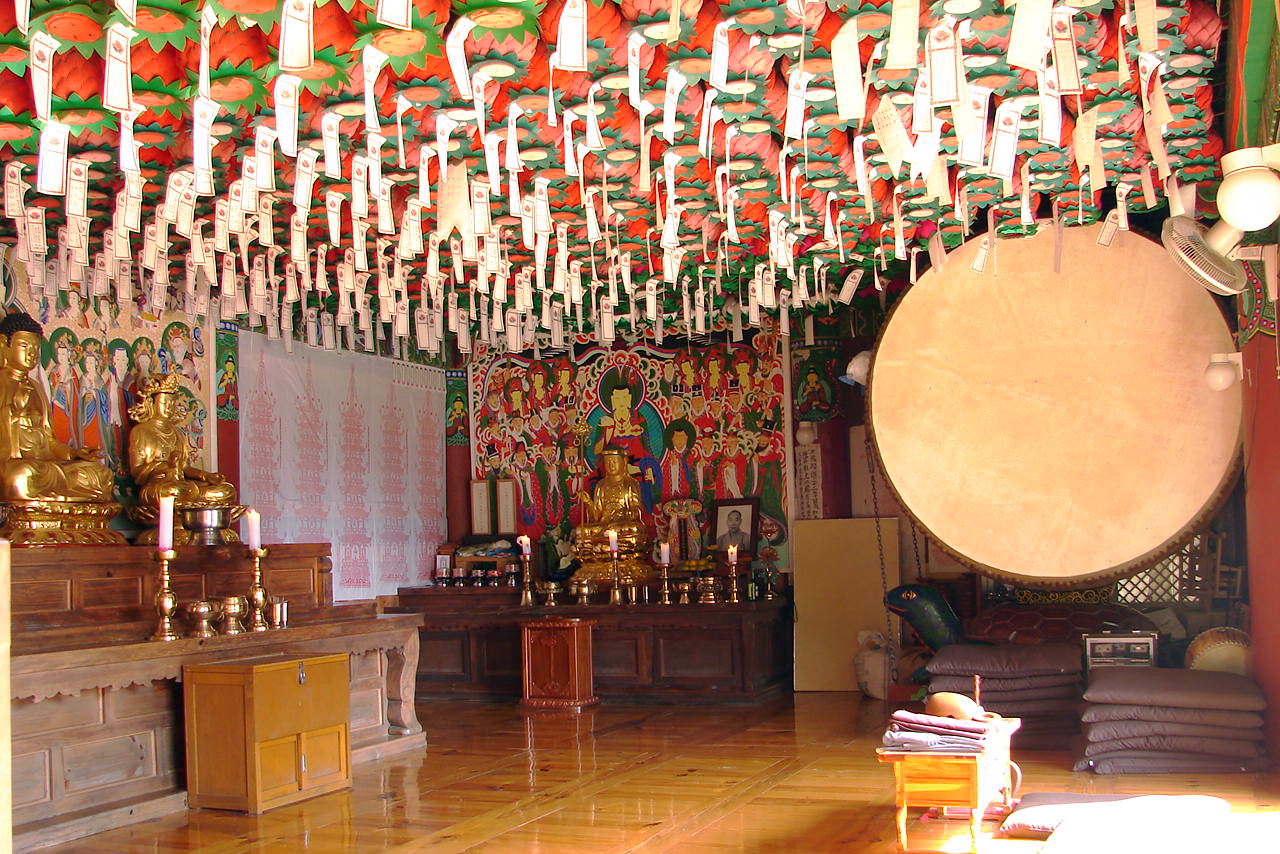

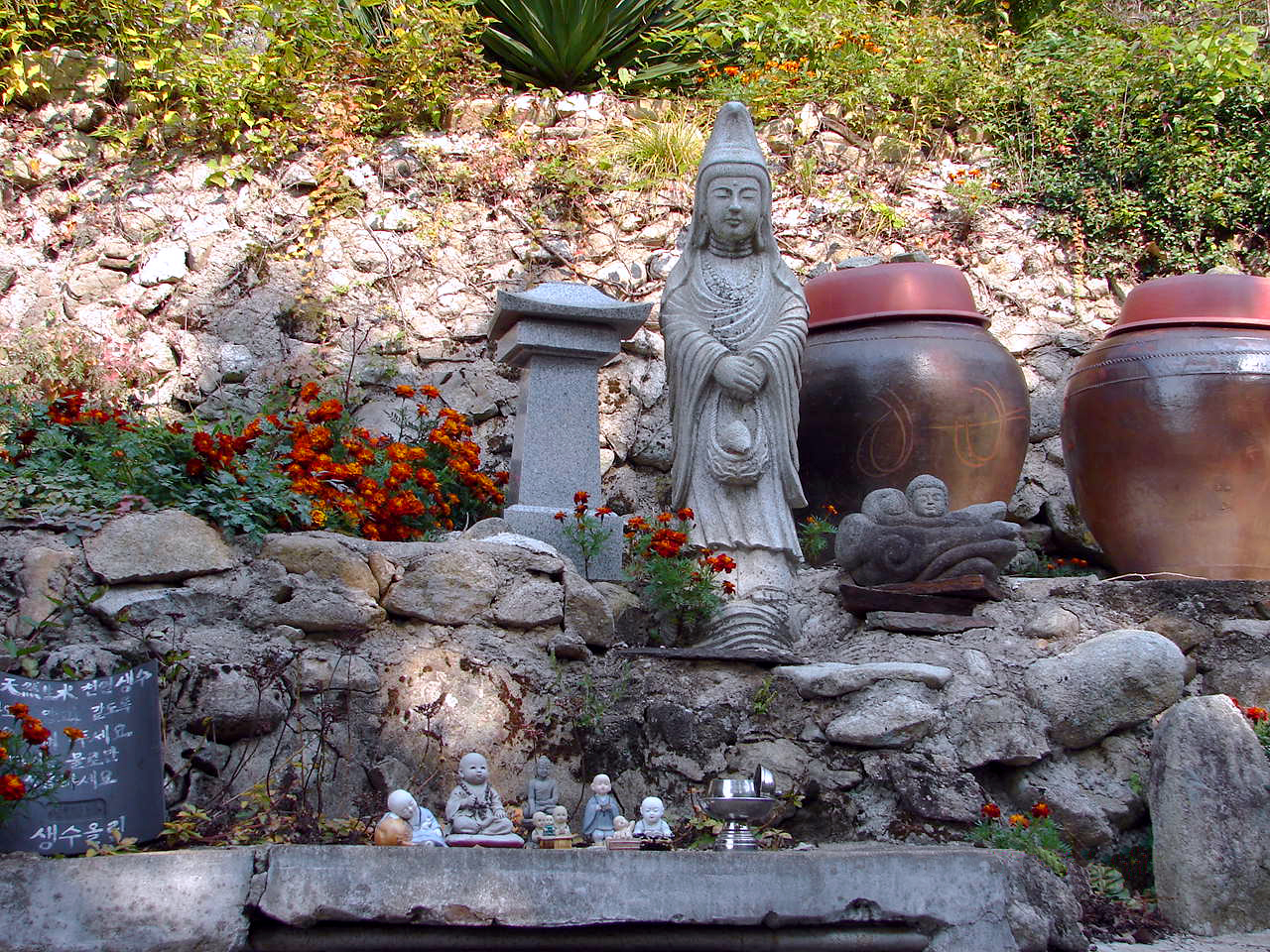

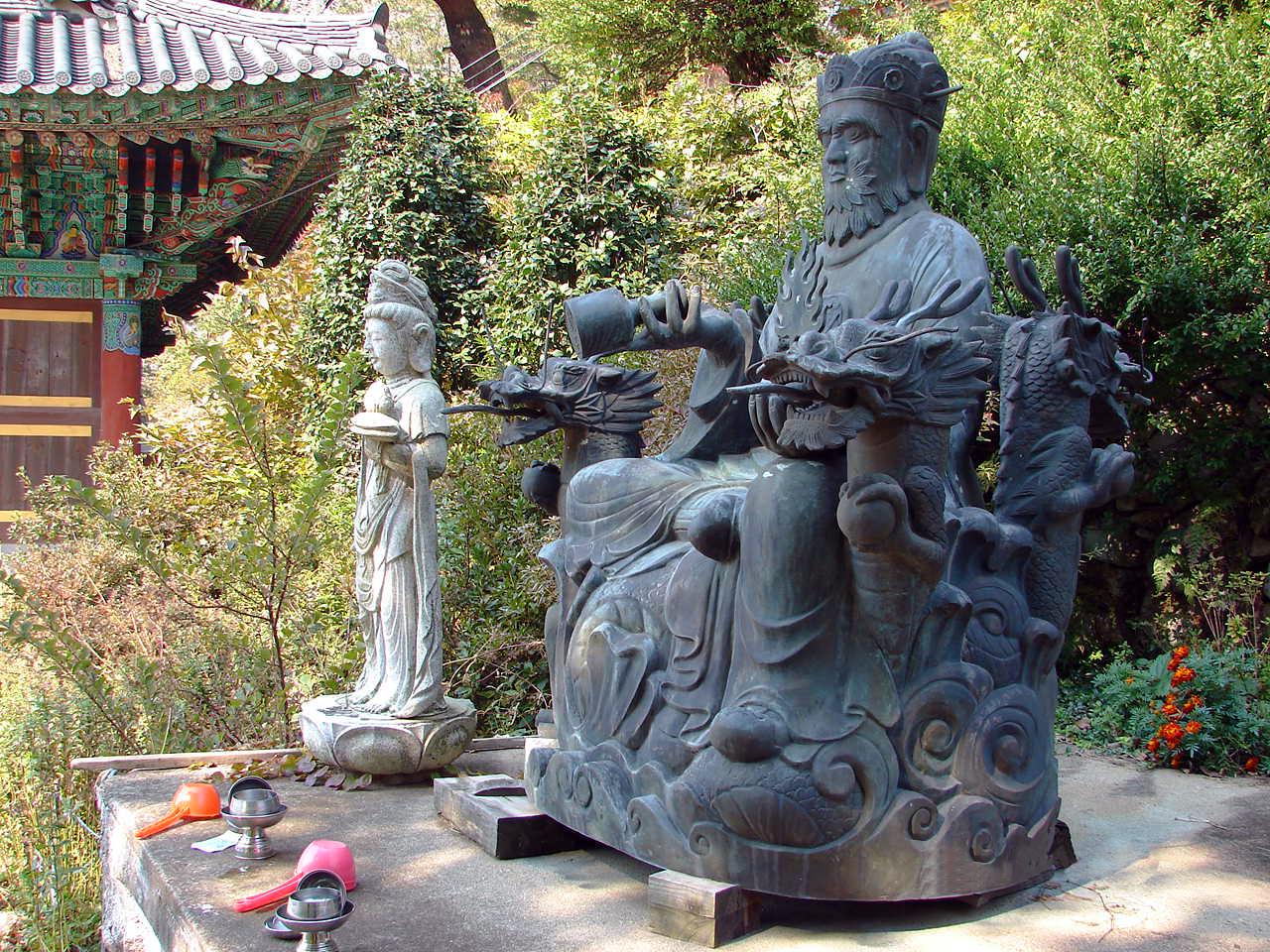

== See also ==
- Maisan
