= Dapo Adelugba =

Nigerian academic, theatre critic and playwright

Adedapo Abayomi Adelugba (1939 - 2014) was a Nigerian academic, theatre critic and playwright who spent a considerable part of his academic career at University of Ibadan where he was a director of the university's theatre troupe. Adelugba was also the director of Nigeria's drama entry to the Second World Festival of Arts and Culture.

As a theatre arts scholar and critic, he worked with noted dramatists and writers such as Wole Soyinka, Ola Rotimi, John Pepper Clark and Abiola Irele, he later edited celebratory books about Wole Soyinka titled Before our very eyes : tribute to Wole Soyinka, winner of the Nobel Prize for Literature and another for Wale Ogunyemi titled Chief Wale Ogunyemi at fifty : essays in honour of a Nigerian actor-dramatist.

== Life ==
Adelugba was born in Ondo, a town in Ondo State, his father Benjamin Adelugba was a native of Esa-Oke and his mother, Beatrice Adelugba was from Ibadan. Adelugba was a graduate of Government College, Ibadan from where he obtained a West African School Certificate, he later earned a Higher School Certificate in 1958 from the same institution. He completed his collegiate studies at University College, Ibadan with a degree in English and later obtained a master's degree in theatre arts from UCLA. While in America, he worked as an assistant at Lake Erie College and was an actor at Karamu House, Adelugba also studied at the Pasadena Playhouse. Upon his return to Nigeria, he briefly taught at Ibadan Grammar School before joining the academic staff of University in Ibadan. During the civil war, Wole Soyinka, the university's theatre troupe director was detained and responsibility fell on Adelugba to direct Orisun Theatre, the school's drama group.

As a theatre critic and academic, he initiated a literary journal called Literature, the Arts, Culture and Education (LACE occasional publications), which chronicles personalities and events within the industry.

In 1977, he directed Wale Ogunyemi's Langbodo as Nigeria's drama entry for Festac 77.
