= Dapo language =

Dapo may be:

- Krumen language, a dialect continuum with over a dozen dialects spoken by the Krumen people of Liberia and Ivory Coast, a branch of the Grebo languages, a subfamily of the Kru languages and ultimately of the Niger–Congo languages
- Nambo language, a Papuan dialect cluster of Papua New Guinea
