= Jinan County =

Coordinates: 35°47′30″N 127°25′31″E

Jinan
- County
- Panoramic view of Jinan-eup

- Flag Emblem of Jinan

- Location in South Korea
- Country: South Korea
- State: Jeonbuk
- Administrative divisions: 1 eup, 10 myeon

Area
  - Total: 788.94 km^{2} (304.61 sq mi)

Population (2021)
  - Total: 24,987
  - Density: 32/km^{2} (83/sq mi)
  - Dialect: Jeolla

Korean name
- Hangul: 진안군
- Hanja: 鎭安郡
- RR: Jinan-gun
- MR: Chinan-gun

Jinan County (Korean: 진안군) is a county in Jeonbuk State, South Korea.

== Introduce ==
Famous as the "sacred peak" or the "center-piece" of the southwestern provinces, the mysterious Maisan Mountain forms the watershed of the Geumgang River and Seomjingang River in Jinan-gun, where kind-hearted people thrive on the nation's granary land. The high-altitude land is well suited to the cultivation of Jinan's special products: ginseng, deodeok(lanceolate) root, shiitake mushrooms, black pigs, and delicious top-grade hot peppers.

== Jinan 8 Scenic Beauties ==
Mai Mountain
The 100 million year old mystery is pleasing to the senses. Mai Mountain! was easily overlooked with the simple story that the mountain looks like a horse's ear without acknowledging its mysteries, legends and histories of nature kept in it. Mai Mountain, the only double peaked mountain in the world, is at the center of Jinan Heights on the boundary of the Noryeong Mountains, approximately 32 km to the east of Jeonju and 3 km to the southeast of Jinan-Eup. The whole mountain consists of the sedimentary rocks. The female Mai peak of 673m and the male Mai peak of 667m form the backbone of the Geumgang and Seomjingang rivers.

Gubong Mountain
Gubong Mountain is unique because you can see all noted mountains in Jeolla-Do in every direction when you arrive at Janggunbong Peak (919 m), the top of Gubong Mountain. The mysterious appearance of the mountain with dominant rock peaks as the mountain name, 6 km from Wunjang Mountain toward the northeast, indicates us that it is the noted mountain that we can't easily see. You can clearly see Myeongdobong Peak, Myeongdeokbong Peak and Daedun Mountain forming the Wunilam and Banilam Valley on the north. You have a bird's eye view of Bokdubong Peak and Wunjang Mountain connected in the shape of the letter to the west and appreciate the Oknyeobong Peak, the Bugui Mountain and the Mandeok Mountain on the south. Furthermore, the grandiose appearance of Deokyu Mountain and Jiri Mountain enters your line of sight on the southeast.

Mai Mountain Stone Pagoda Group
If the culmination of mystery made by the nature is Ai Mountain, the summit of mystery made by the people will be Cheonjitap and stone pagodas made of natural stone. The pagoda group under the cliff south of the female Maibong Peak was built by arranging the stones by Paljindobeop drawing in accordance with the harmony of Yin and Yang. The pagodas show the culmination of harmony, sophisticated like an awl and elegant like a big mountain and stand row after row with the main pagoda, Cheonjitap Pagoda, as the summit. The Cheonjitap Pagoda is also a couple pagoda. The pagodas were built based on the Yin and Yang philosophy. The construction of Yin and Yang pagodas on the Yin and Yang Mountain includes a mystery that can't be called an accident.

Yongdamho Lake
Yongdamho LakeYongdamho Lake is the artificial lake created by Yongdam Dam. Yongdam Dam is the grand freshwater lake formed by submersing 1 Eup and 5 Myeons such as Yongdam-Myeon, Ancheon-Myeon, Jeongcheon-Myeon, parts of Jucheon-Myeon, Sangjeon-Myeon and part of Jinan-Eup. Yongdam Dam is a concrete rockfill dam, 70m high and 498m long. The freshwater dimension is 30km2, the total volume is 815 million tons and the effective volume reaches to 682 million tons. Yongdam Dam uses the diversion scheme method. It was built to supply water to the residents in the Jeonju region, Jeollabuk-Do by supplying 1.35 million tons of water per day from the upper Geumgang River to the upper Mangyeonggang River in Sohyang-Ri Gosan-Myeon Gwanju-Gun through the 3.2m diameter and 21.9 km long water conduction tunnel. As the freshwater began to be supplied with the completion of dam construction, Yongdamho Lake became a noted tourists' site not to be missed in Jinan. The route linking Jeongcheon-Myeon, Yongdam-Myeon and Bondaem along the new relocated road around the dam makes for a fantastic drive in harmony with the superb view of the lake. The route linking Ancheon-Myeon and Bondaem is not inferior to the route above.

Using the rivers of Jucheon, Ancheon, Jeongcheon and Sangjeon, the clean and clear mountain areas in northeast Jeollabuk-Do, flowing in around Yongdam, Yongdam Dam was built to supply water to the residents all over Jeollabuk-Do including Jeonju, Gunsan and Iksan. Yongdam Dam project has been a long-cherished project of Jeollabuk-Do. We can't deny that we may have losses even though the construction of dam controls flooding around Geumgang River. As about of Jinan is submersed, the sorrow of people whose hometown was in the dam area before submersion will constantly remain.

Wunilam Banilam
Wunilam BanilamThe marvelous harmony of fantastic rocks and cliffs, clear water and green mountains, heaven and earth, create the scenic masterpiece of Wunilam and Banilam. Run 24 km via Jeongcheon from Jinan-Eup toward the north, and you will arrive at Jucheon-Myeon. Go up about 2 km along the upper Jujacheon River toward the Wunjang Mountain, and you will see the marvelous scene of Wunilam and Banilam. The Jujacheon River valley, about 5m between Myeongdeokbong Peak (845.5m) and Myeongdobong Peak (863m) on the northeast of Wunjang Mountain is called Wunilam and Banilam. There were only the passing cloud, the sky, the stone and the tree because there was only the steep cliff about 70 years ago

Recreation Forest of Wunjang Mountain
The marvelous harmony of fantastic rocks and cliffs, clear water and green mountains, heaven and earth, create the scenic masterpiece of Wunilam and Banilam. People can run 24 km via Jeongcheon from Jinan-Eup toward the north, and arrive at Jucheon-Myeon. Then they must go up about 2 km along the upper Jujacheon River toward the Wunjang Mountain, and see the marvelous scene of Wunilam and Banilam. The Jujacheon River valley, about 5 meters between Myeongdeokbong Peak (845.5 meters) and Myeongdobong Peak (863 meters) on the northeast of Wunjang Mountain is called Wunilam and Banilam. There were only the passing cloud, the sky, the stone and the tree because there was only the steep cliff about 70 years ago.

Wunjang Mountain
Wunjang Mountain is the dividing ridge of Geumgang River and Mangyeonggang River. Set on the northwestern side of Jinan Heights, it is the oldest peak in the southwestern part of Korea, with the plateau at a height of 1,126m stretching over Dongsang-Myeon of Wangju-Gun, Jeongcheon, Bugui and Jucheon. On the east side stands the Gubong Mountain. With the Gubong Mountain, the Wunjang Mountain achieves great fame as the great mountain with the extraordinary mountain. The Wunjang Mountain has three peaks. The middle peak? called Sangbong Peak, between the east and west peaks, is the highest. It takes about 3 to 4 hours in general but 5 to 6 hours in winter to go around the ridge of pampas grass and small bamboo field.

Punghyeol-Naengcheon(Wind Hole and Cold Spring)
Go about 10 km from the south to the west of Mai Mountain, and you will find the Punghyeol-Naengcheon on the foot of Daedu Mountain in Yanghwa Village, Seongsu-Myeon. The wind path that was said to have ice even in summer long ago keeps the temperature inside the 67m2 cave? at about 4 by letting the cold wind of 4 out from the gap of Daam rocks. It was used as the agar plant and silkworm eggs storage house during Japanese rule. It is currently used for the residents to keep Kimchi in summer. It is like a refrigerator made by the nature.

== Gallery ==
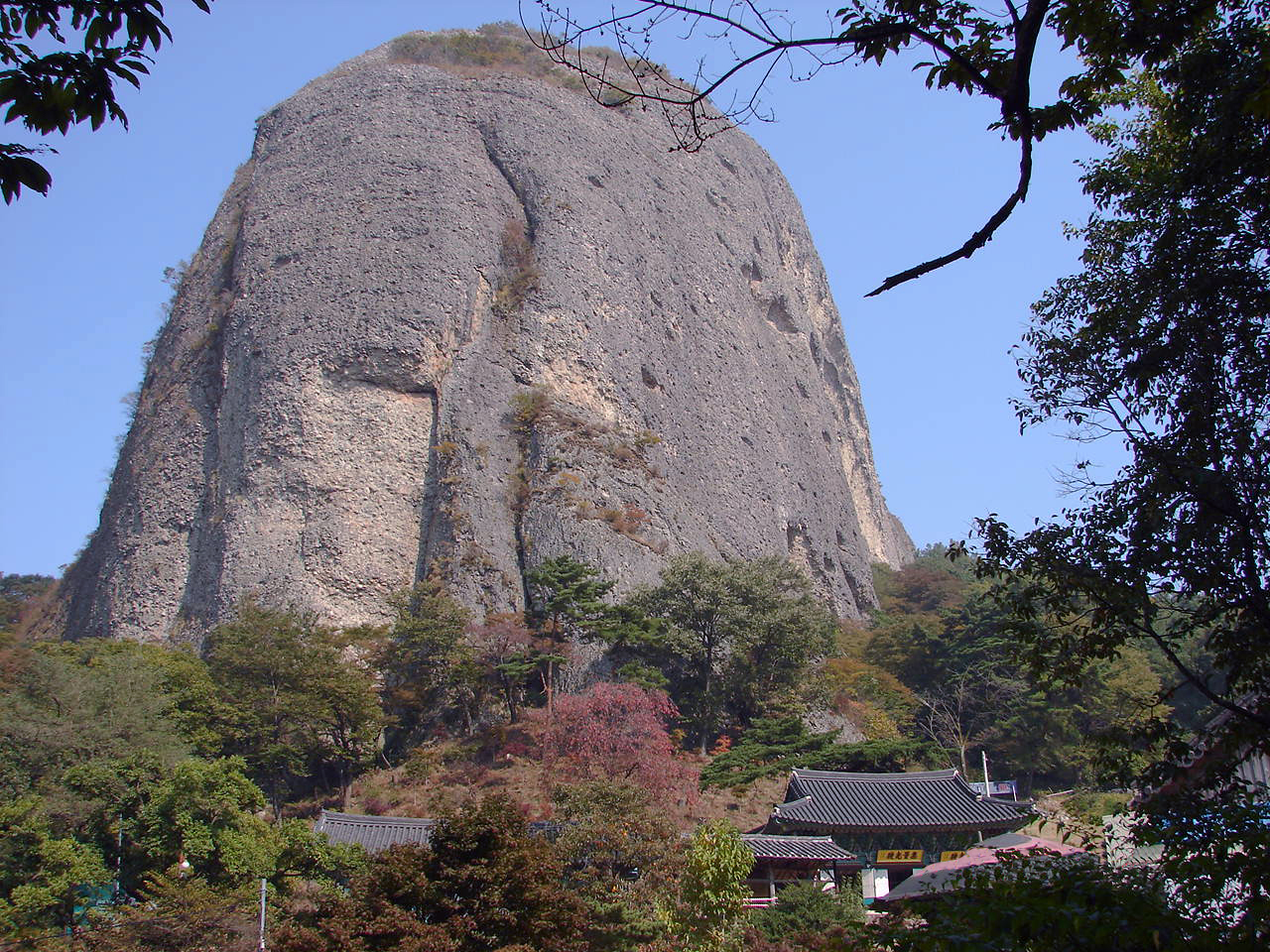
Jinan - Maisan - Eunsusa

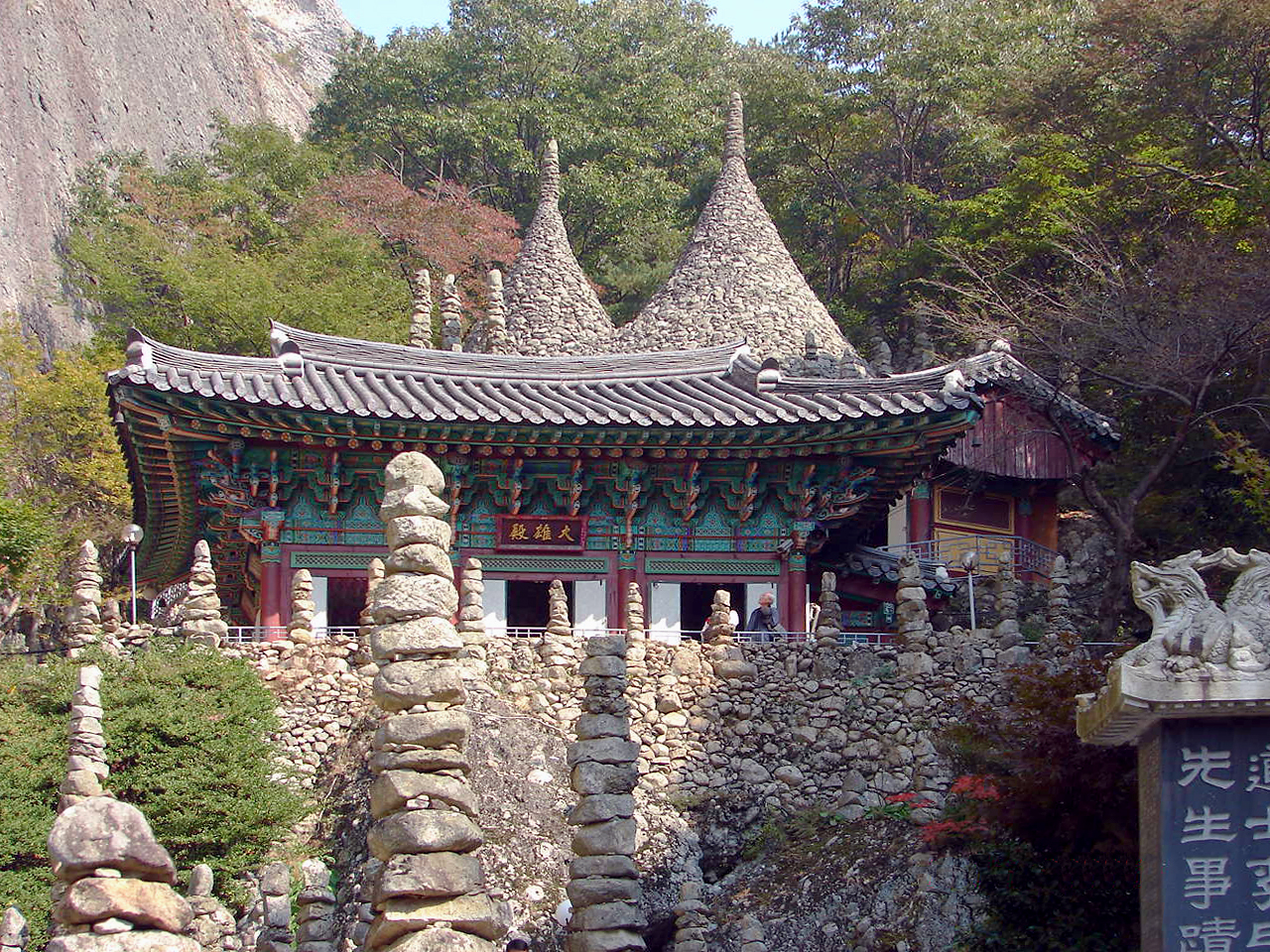
Jinan - Maisan - Tapsa

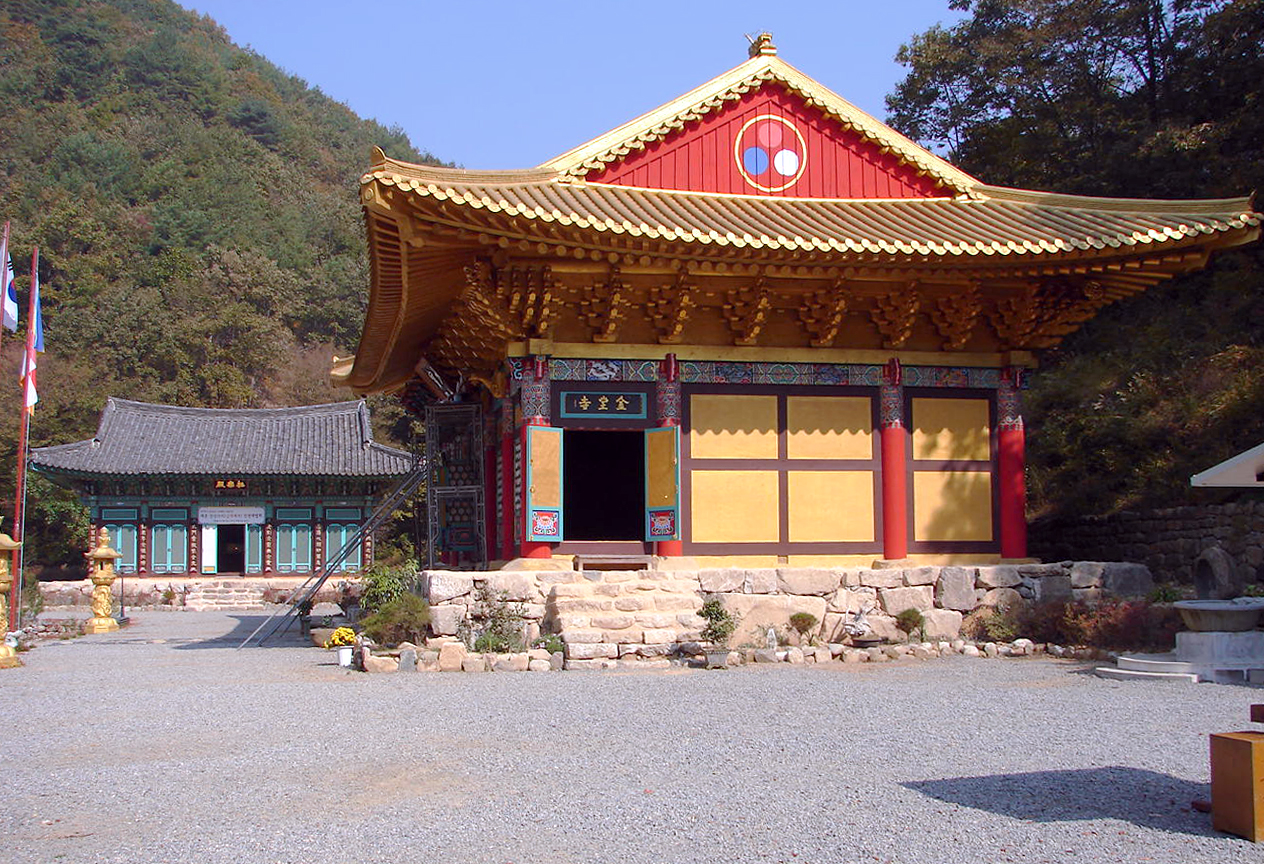
Jinan - Maisan - Geumdang Temple

== Twin towns – sister cities ==
Jinan is twinned with:

- Eunpyeong-gu, South Korea
- Huanren, China
