= Chonsung station =

Pyongyang Metro station

Chonsung station 전승역
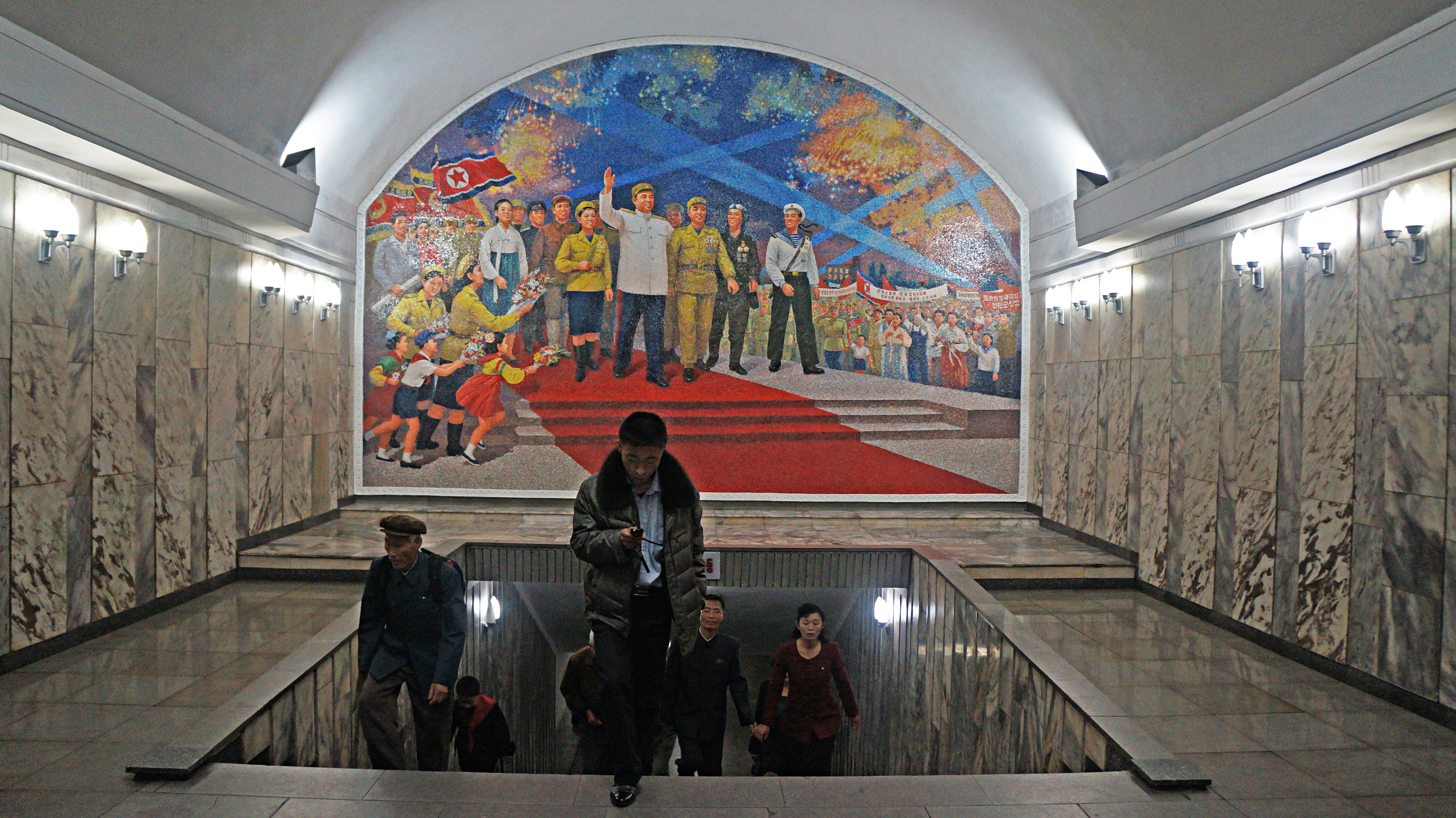

General information
- Location: Moranbong-guyok, Pyongyang; Democratic People's Republic of Korea
- Coordinates: 39°3′26.7″N 125°45′10.1″E
- Platforms: 1
- Tracks: 2
- Connections: Chollima Line (Jonu station)

History
- Opened: September 9, 1975

Services
Preceding station	Pyongyang Metro	Following station
Hyoksin towards Kwangbok	Hyoksin Line	Samhung towards Ragwon
Location

Chonsung station (Korean: 전승역; Hanja: 戰勝驛, or Jŏnsŭng station) is a station on Hyŏksin Line of the Pyongyang Metro.

The station is a short walking distance from the Jonu station, Embassy of the People's Republic of China and Ryomyonggori Cinema.

This station was refurbished in 2020, when Ryomyong Street was constructed. The platform level is now much brighter, TVs and seats have been added including a revamped exterior building.
