= Trams in Pyongyang =

Public transport in Pyongyang, North Korea

Pyongyang Tram
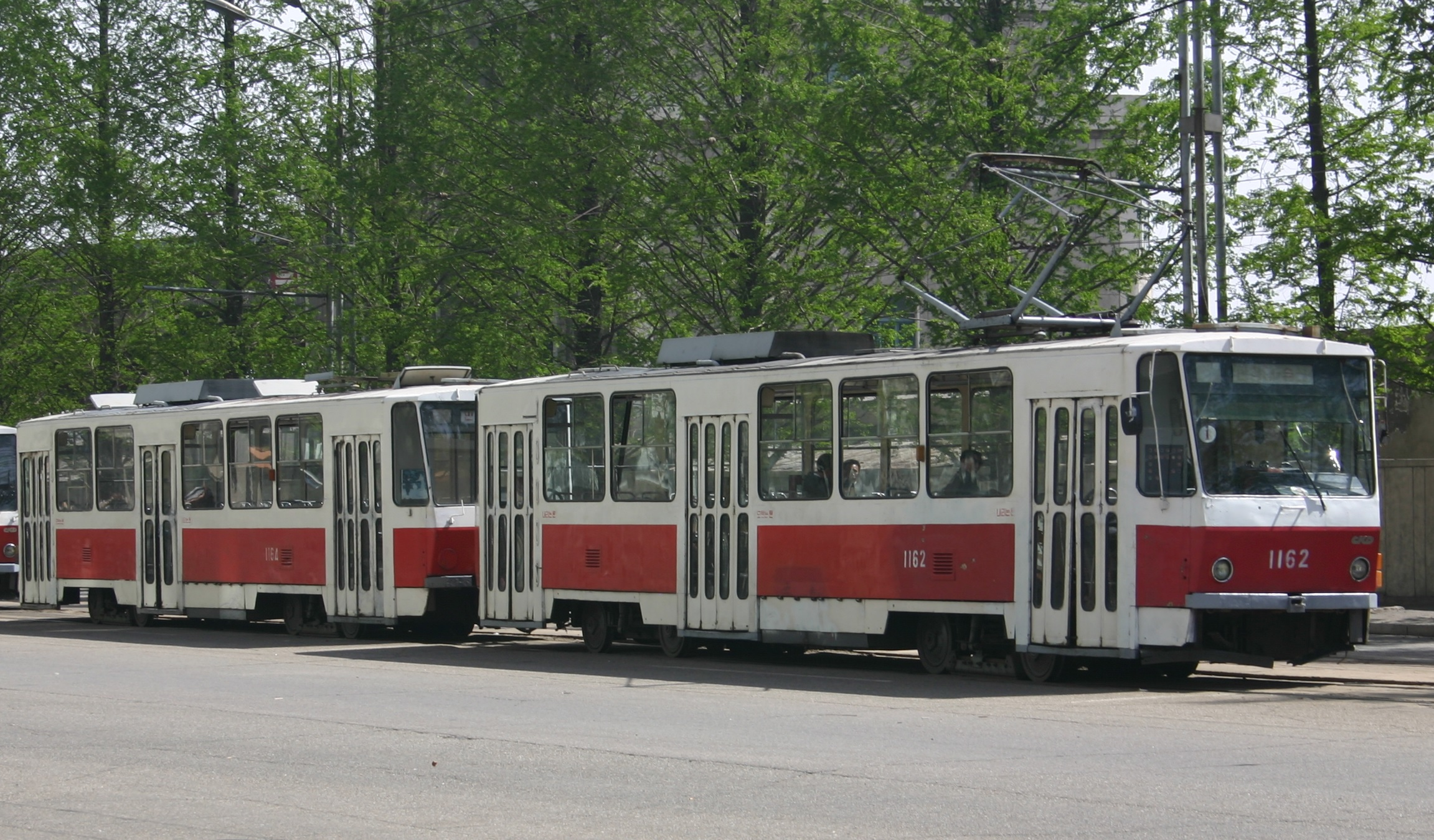
- Older Tatra T6B5 vehicles on tram line 1

Overview
- Locale: (North Korea) Pyongyang
- Transit type: Tram
- Number of lines: 4
- Line number: 1, 2, 3, Kumsusan

Operation
- Began operation: 1989
- Operator: Guidance Bureau of Passenger Service in Pyongyang
- Character: At-grade
- Train length: 2 car multiple unit, 3 section articulated tram

Technical
- System length: 53.5 km (33 mi)
- Track gauge: 1,435 mm (4 ft 8 1/2 in); 1,000 mm (3 ft 3 3/8 in)
- Electrification: Overhead DC 600 V, 20 A; up to 200 A during acceleration
- Top speed: 60 kilometres per hour (37 mph)
Tram Lines in Pyongyang
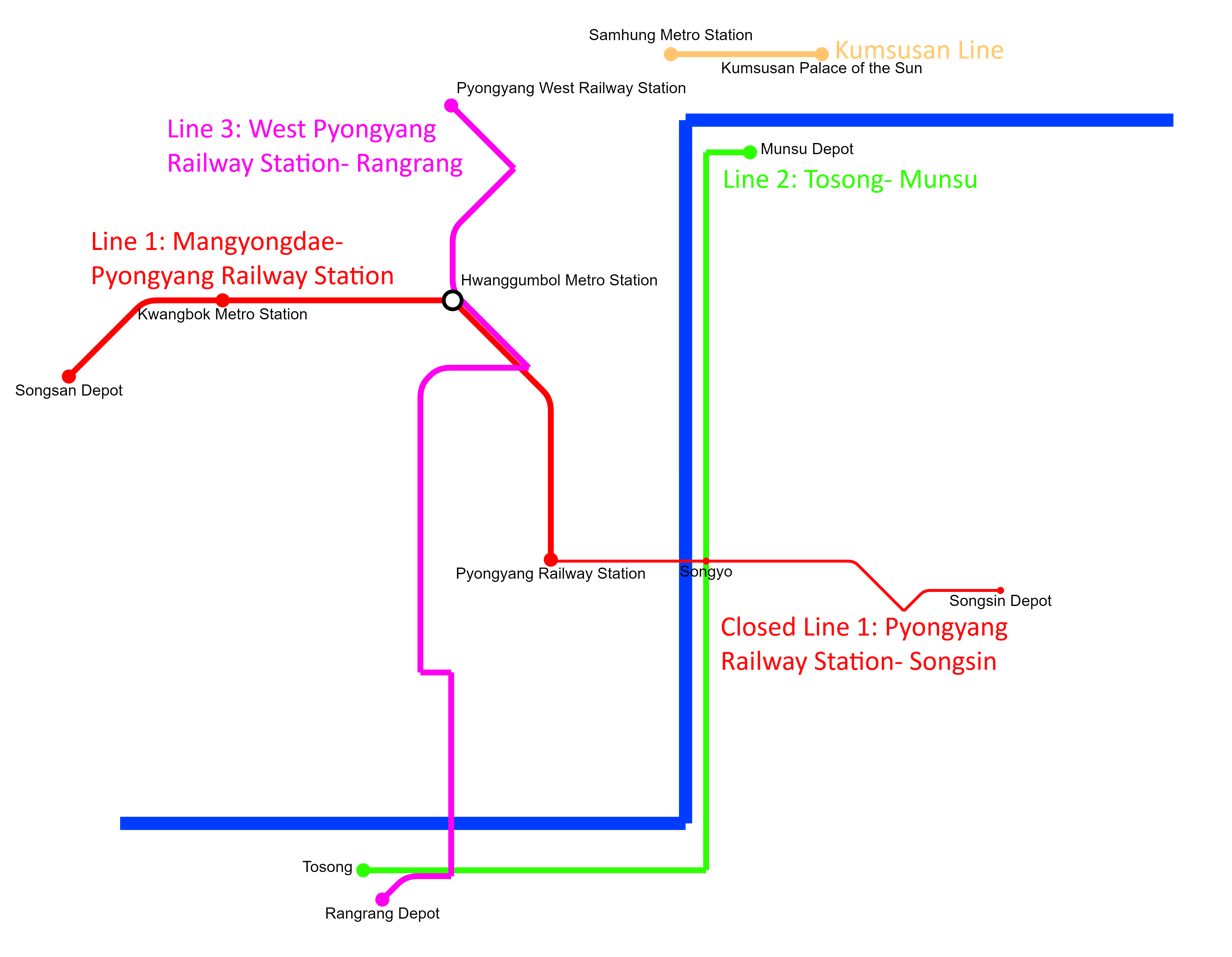

- Pyongyang Tram
- Chosŏn'gŭl: 평양 궤도전차
- Hancha: 平壤 軌道電車
- Revised Romanization: Pyeongyang gwedojeoncha
- McCune–Reischauer: P'yŏngyang kwedojŏnch'a

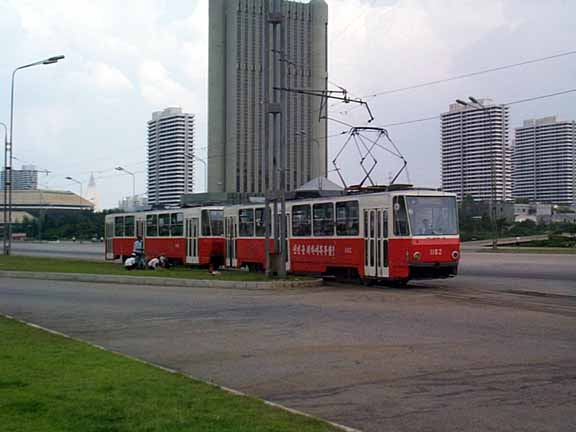
A Tatra T6B5 vehicle in Pyongyang.

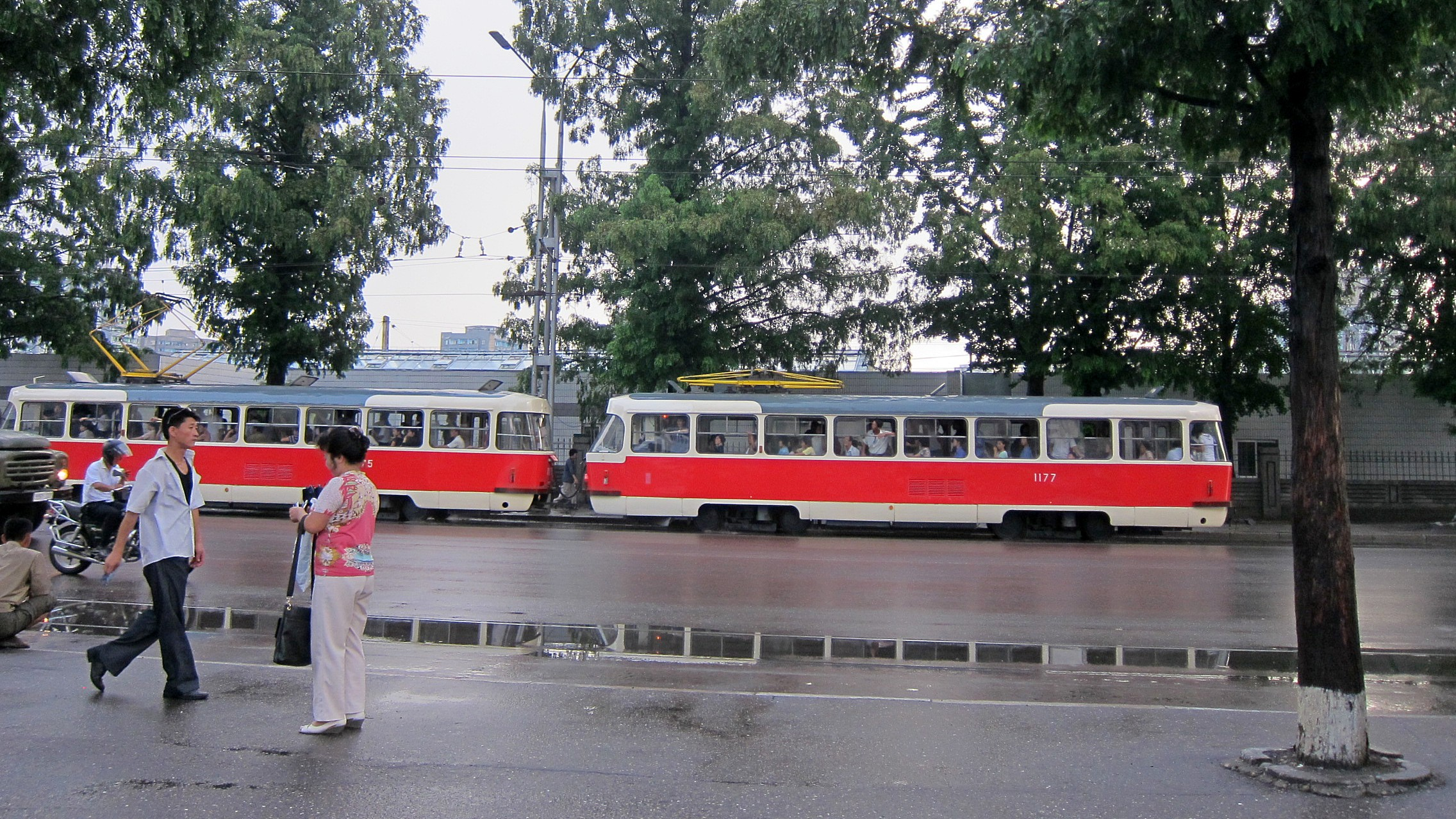
A crowded Line 1 tram during afternoon rush hour in 2012.

Pyongyang Tram is a public tram system in Pyongyang, the capital of North Korea. The first line of the current system opened in 1989. There are four lines in operation.

== Overview ==
Before the Korean War from 1950 to 1953, there were three tramway systems in the Korean Peninsula: one each in Seoul, Busan and Pyongyang.

During the North Korean famine, the service of tram lines became sparse, and often trams would not run due to lack of drivers and shortage of electricity.

Unlike South Korea, personal ownership of automobiles in North Korea is very rare. North Koreans, especially those living in Pyongyang and other major cities, rely mainly on public transport. In Pyongyang, there are trolleybuses (the Pyongyang trolleybus system) and subways (the Pyongyang Metro), with these two serving as its main forms of public transport. However, as trolleybus lines became gradually overcrowded, the city decided to re-open tram lines. The first line was opened on 15 April 1991.

A number of Tatra T4 trams and its trailer B4 were bought from Dresden, Magdeburg and Leipzig in 1997–1998.

From 14 October 2002, the section of Line 1 between P'yŏngyang-yŏk and Songyo was closed, as the bridge over Taedong River started to deteriorate, splitting Line 1 into two parts divided by the Taedong River. The section from Songyo to Songsin was eventually replaced by a trolleybus in 2014. The part crossing the bridge was replaced by a bus service. Demolition of the tracks between Songyo and Pyongyang Station was completed by 9 September 2003.

In 2008, the City Transportation Company of Prague sold 20 used T3s to Pyongyang Public Transportation Enterprise together with a shipment of tram-rails. These trams were built ranging from 1967 for the Tatra T3 in original modification, to 1987 for the T3SUCS modification.

After the closure of Songsin depot, an extension was added to Rangnang depot to house the trams transferred from that depot.

Foreign tourists were previously not permitted to ride the tram lines, but some recent tours have started to include tramway rides (though rides are not shared with locals and are instead chartered, unlike the Pyongyang Metro).

Due to the need for transport, tram drivers may be assigned shifts even on holidays.

== Lines ==
There are three lines in operation plus a meter gauge line operated by the military.

Line Number	Route	Notes
#1	Mangyongdae (만경대; 萬景臺) - Pyongyang station (평양역; 平壤驛)	Formerly ran to Songsin until bridge was closed to tram traffic, line split into Mangyongdae- Pyongyang Station and Songsin-Songyo until 2014, when during reconstruction of tram lines elsewhere, this line was converted to trolleybus line #4 Replaced former trolleybus line 10 from Mangyongdae to Chollima Street and 8 to Hwanggumbol station. Trams housed at Songsan Depot, Mangyongdae-guyok, operated by Songsan Tram Service Company.
#2	Munsu (문수; 紋繡) - T'osŏng (토성; 土城)	Runs on east side of Taedong River, replaced former trolleybus line 7. Trams housed at Munsu Tram Office
#3	West P'yŏngyang Station (서평양; 西平壤) - Rangrang (락랑; 樂浪)	Only line to currently cross the Taedong River Trams housed at depot at Rangnang, operated by Rangnang Tram Station.
Kumsusan	Samhung station (삼흥역) - Kumsusan Palace of the Sun (금수산태양궁전)	Opened on 7 July 1995 when Kim Il-sung's mausoleum opened, to replace the closed Kwangmyong station. Operated by the military using meter gauge SWS/MFO/BBC Be 4/4 trams and SIG B4 trailers.

As of 2006, the fare is ₩5 for any section. There are also coupon tickets (시내 차표; 市內車票; sinae ch'ap'yo) issued in the form of tickets inserted into the fare box.

== Rolling stock ==
For the full list, see Trams and trolleybuses in North Korea

Prior to 2018, the rolling stock used were the Czechoslovak ČKD Praha Tatra T6B5K, Tatra T3/SUCS, Tatra T4D and B4D and KT8D5K in either red/white livery or blue/white. The Kŭmsusan line uses VBZ Be 4/4 Type Ib rolling stock on a different gauge of 1,000 mm, rather than 1,435 mm for lines 1–3. The Shenyang ST4 had been retired in 1999 due to their failing articulation joint and subsequently converted into Chollima-961/971 trolleybuses while it is possible others were sent to the Chongjin tram system where they received a new body at the Chongjin Bus Factory.

According to a Czech reporter, 42 out of the original 45 KT8D5 trams still run. Despite sanctions limiting the supply of spare parts, trams operate with below average maintenance, though the more recent development of locally built electrical equipment and continued maintenance without a foreign supply of spare parts have raised suspicions in Czech media.

In August 2018, following the introduction of new trolleybuses and metro cars, new partially domestically-produced tram cars were introduced in Pyongyang for the first time in about twenty years. The bodies were manufactured by Pyongyang Bus Repair Factory and named Thongil-181, on the chassis of the Tatra KT8D5K.

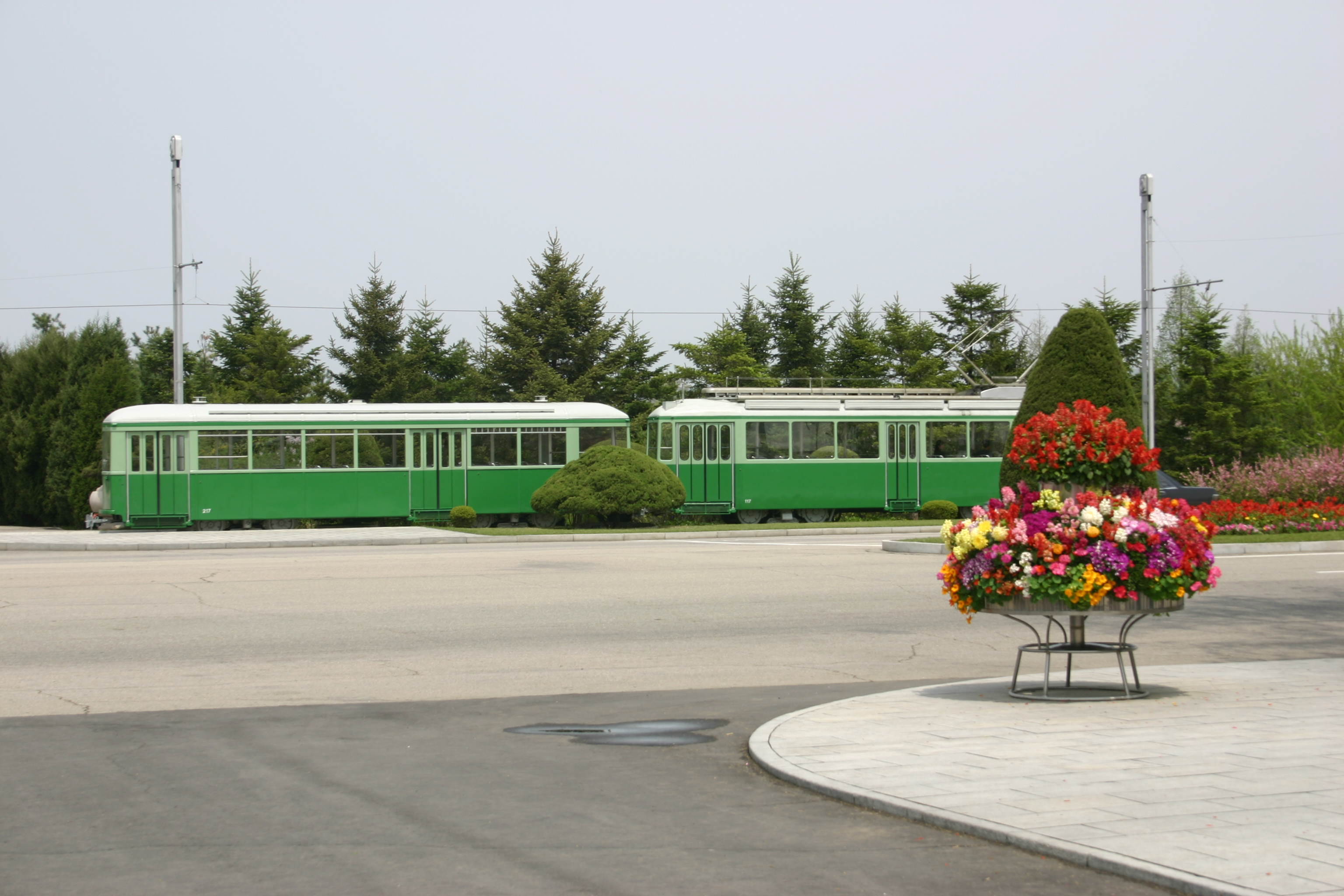
A VBZ tram on the Kŭmsusan line in 2005

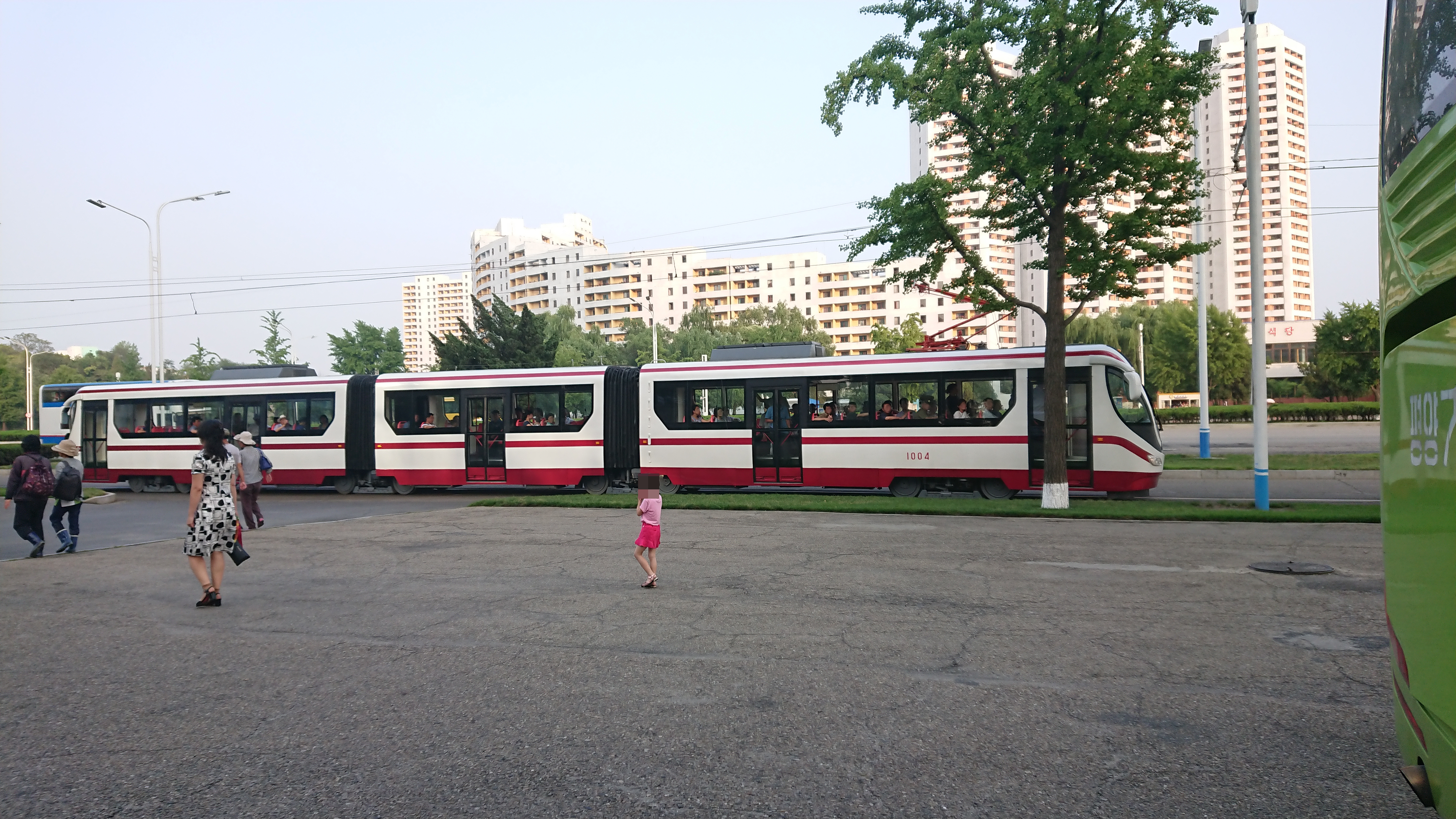
A Thongil-181 tram

== See also ==
- Pyongyang Metro
- Trams and trolleybuses in North Korea
- Transport in North Korea
- List of tram and light rail transit systems
- Trolleybuses in Pyongyang
