= Konsol station =

Pyongyang Metro station

Kŏnsŏl Station 건설역
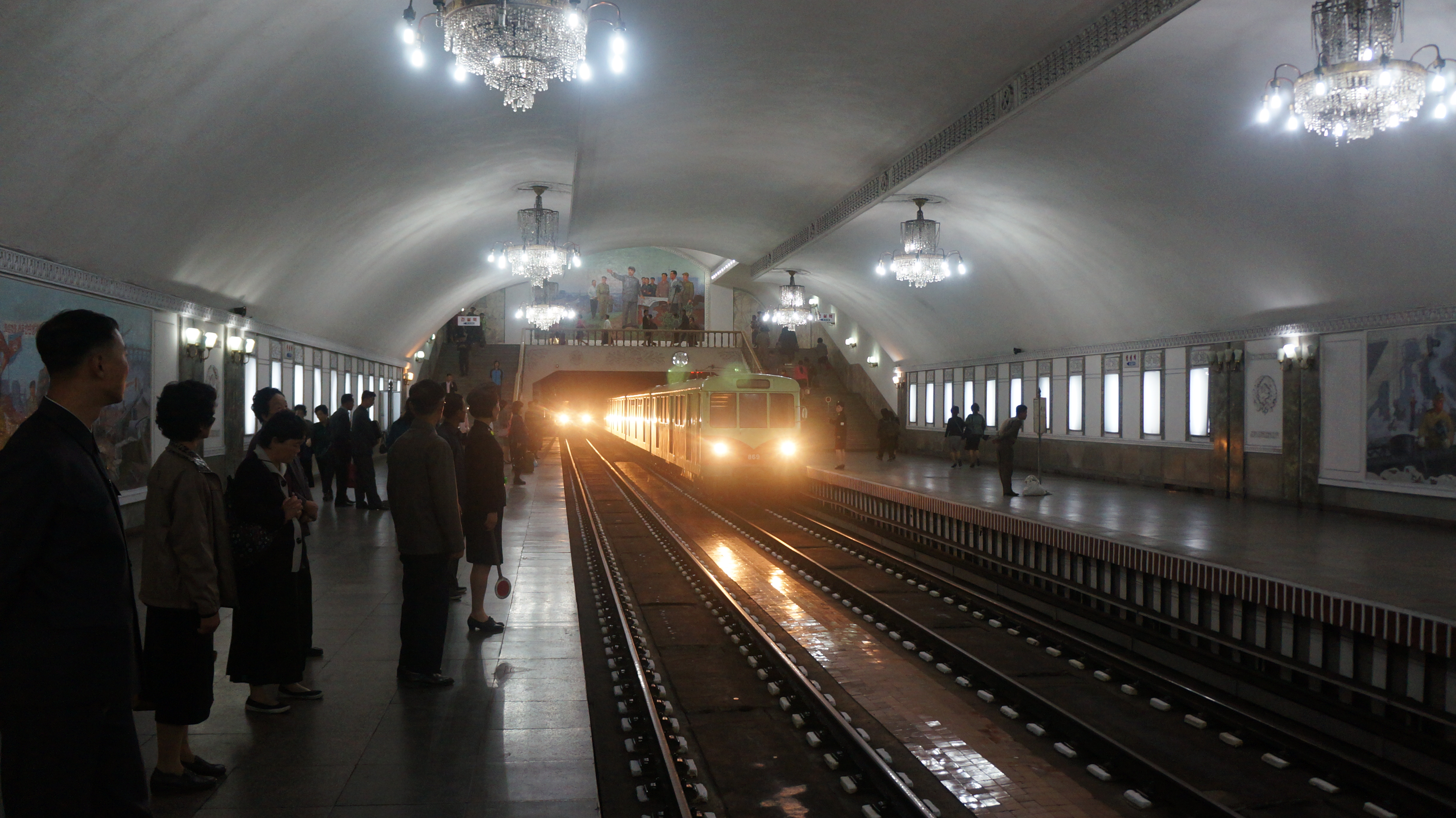
- The side platforms of Kŏnsŏl Station

General information
- Location: Potonggang-guyok, Pyongyang; Democratic People's Republic of Korea
- Coordinates: 39°2′5.2″N 125°43′57.5″E
- Operator: Pyongyang Metro
- Platforms: 2 (2 side platforms)
- Tracks: 2

Construction
- Structure type: Underground
- Accessible: No

History
- Opened: 6 September 1978

Services
| Preceding station | Pyongyang Metro | Following station |
|---|---|---|
| Hwanggumbol towards Kwangbok | Hyoksin Line | Hyoksin towards Ragwon |
Location

Kŏnsŏl Station (Korean: 건설역; Hanja: 建設驛) is a station on Hyŏksin Line of the Pyongyang Metro. It is notable for being the only station in the Pyongyang Metro to use side platforms, as all other stations use an island platform configuration instead.

The station is in front of the Ryugyong Hotel and a short distance from Pyongyang University of Science and Technology, Victorious Fatherland Liberation Museum and Pyongyang Arena.

The station features the murals A Construction Site of Blast Furnace and Builders of the Capital City.
