= Hyoksin Line =

Metro line in Pyongyang, North Korea

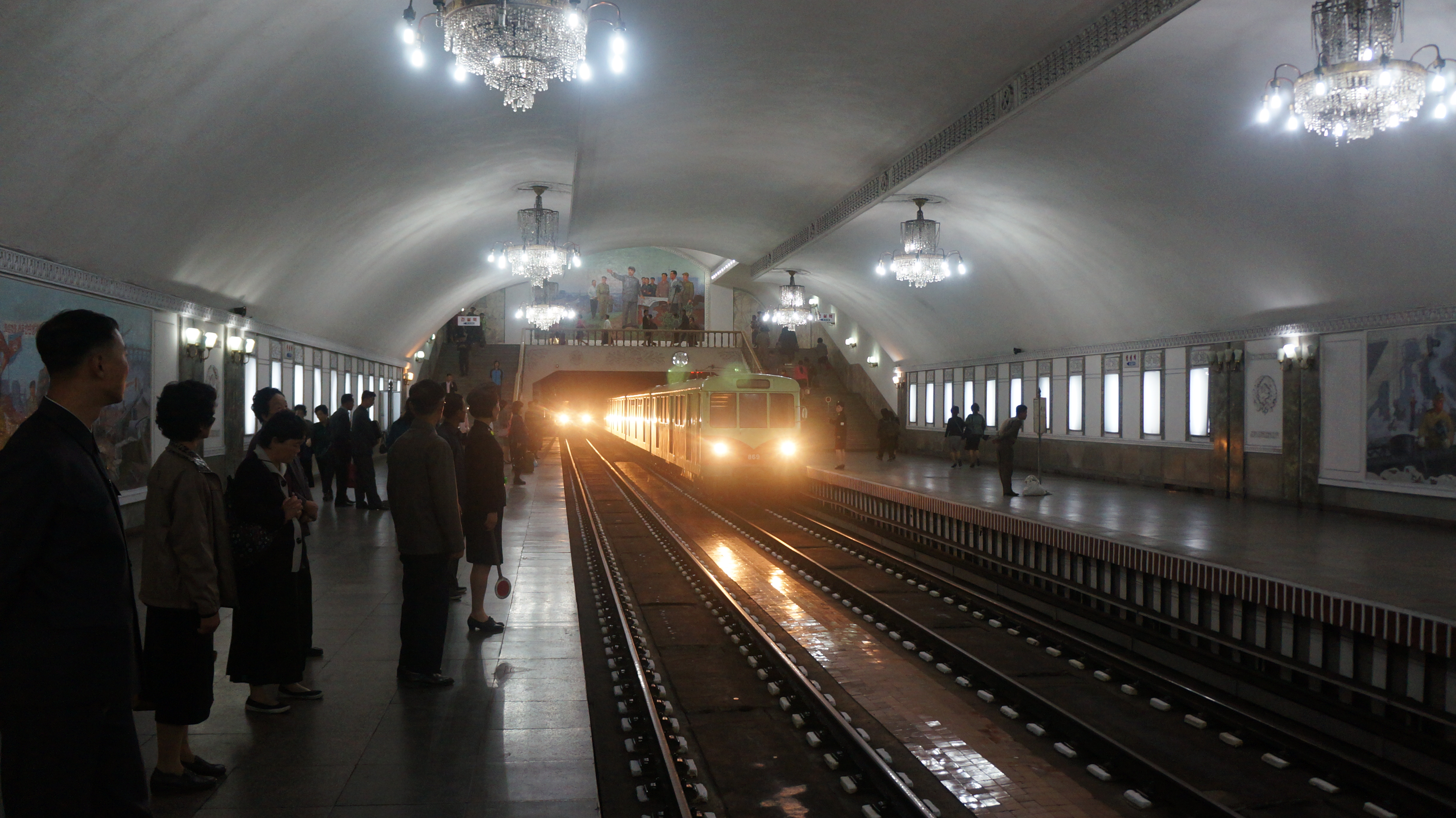
- Konsol station on the Hyoksin Line

Overview
- Owner: Pyongyang Metro
- Locale: Pyongyang
- Termini: Kwangbok; Ragwŏn
- Stations: 9 (include closed station)

Service
- Type: Rapid transit
- Rolling stock: BVG Class D

History
- Opened: 9 September 1975; 51 years ago
- Last extension: 1985

Technical
- Line length: 15 km (9.3 mi)
- Track gauge: 1435mm
- Electrification: 750 V third rail
- Signalling: Automatic block

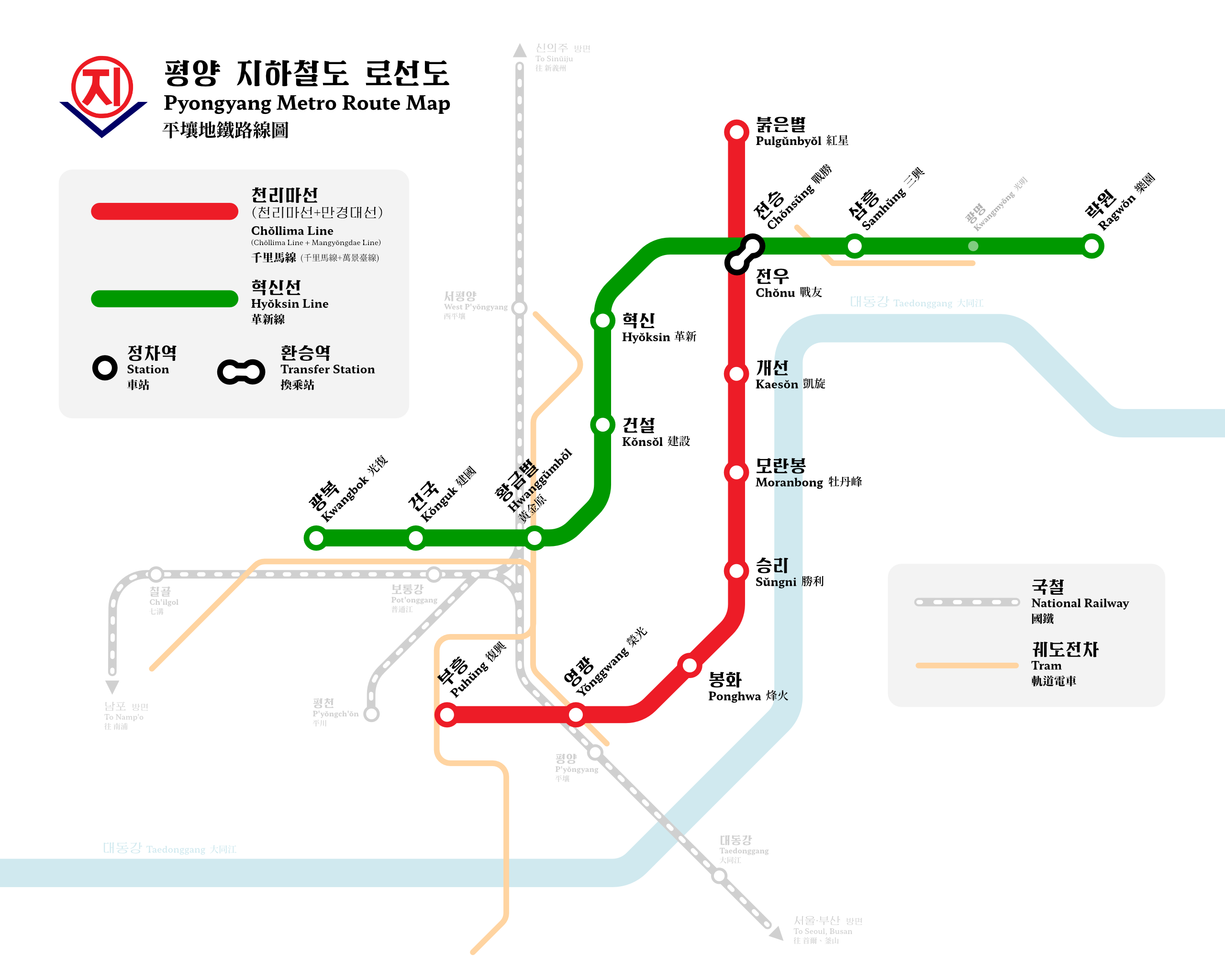

The Hyoksin Line (Korean: 혁신선; Hanja: 革新線) is a rapid transit line owned and operated by Pyongyang Metro in Pyongyang, North Korea.

The location of the depot seems to be to the west of Kwangbok station, although where it actually is located is unknown.

== Stations ==
Stations of the Pyongyang Metro
#2 Hyŏksin Line 혁신선 (革新線)
Station	Name in English	Transfer	Opened
Kwangbok (광복; 光復)	Liberation		9 September 1985
Kŏn'guk (건국; 建國)	State Building	Pot'onggang Station (P'yŏngnam Line); Pyongyang Tram Line 1	9 September 1985
Hwanggŭmbŏl (황금벌; 黃金벌)	Golden Field	Tram Line 1 and 3 Pyongyang trolleybus route 8	6 September 1978
Kŏnsŏl (건설; 建設)	Construction		6 September 1978
Hyŏksin (혁신; 革新)	Innovation		9 September 1975
Jŏnsŭng (전승; 戰勝)	War Victory	Chŏllima Line (Jŏnu)	9 September 1975
Samhŭng (삼흥; 三興)		Kumsusan Line	9 September 1975
Kwangmyŏng (광명; 光明)		Closed in 1995	9 September 1975
Ragwŏn (락원; 樂園)	Paradise		9 September 1975
