= Kwangmyong station =

Kwangmyong station (Korean: 광명역) may refer to the following train stations:

- Kwangmyong station (Kosan County), North Korea
- Kwangmyong station (Pyongyang), North Korea
- Gwangmyeong station, South Korea

== See also ==
- Guangming station, Chinese equivalent
