= Ryugyong Hotel =

Unfinished skyscraper in Pyongyang, North Korea

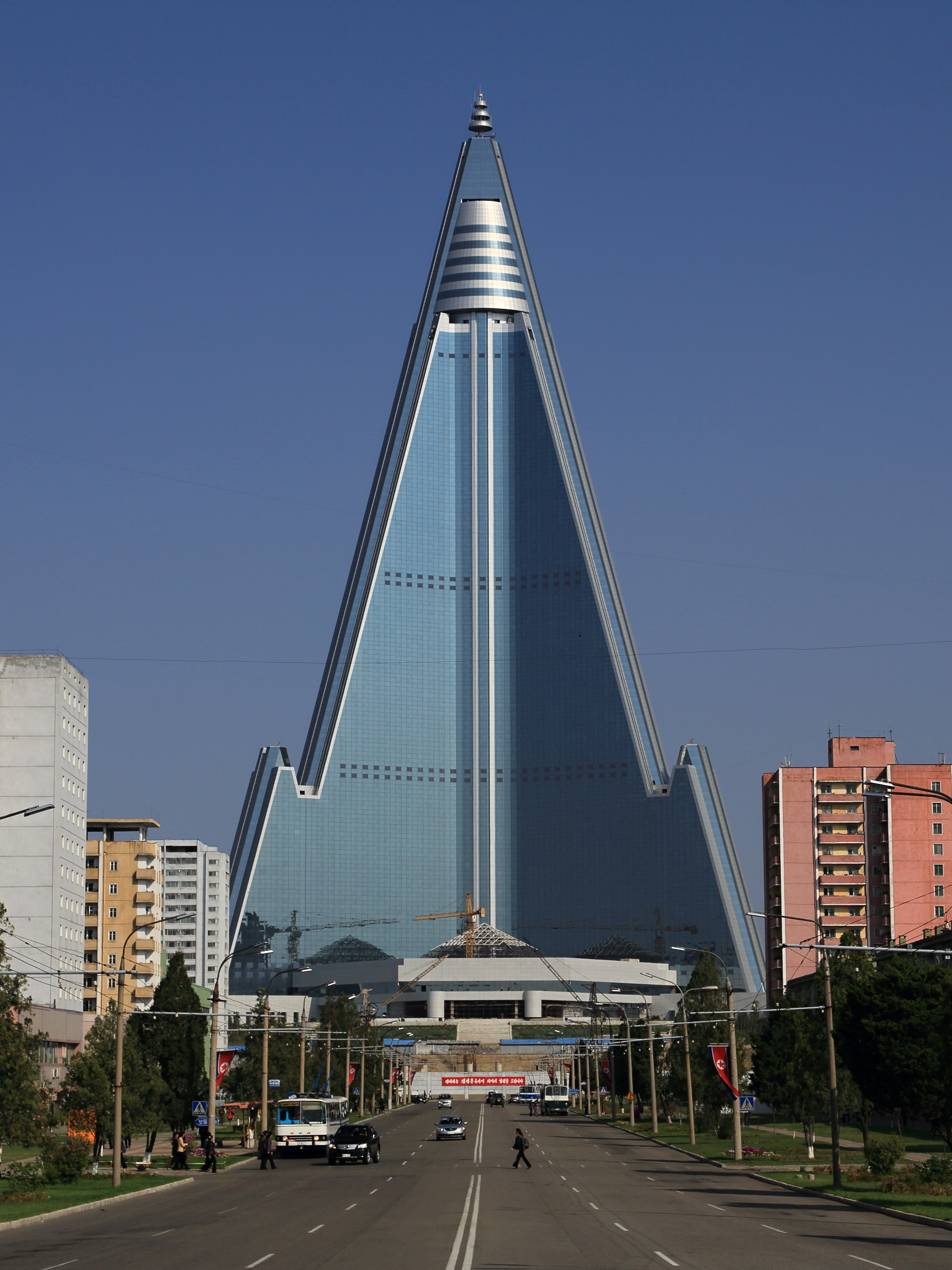
- The Ryugyong Hotel in 2012

General information
- Status: On-hold (unfinished)
- Type: Mixed use: Hotel, Retail, Restaurants
- Architectural style: Neo-futurism
- Location: Ryugyong-dong, Potonggang-guyok, Pyongyang, North Korea
- Coordinates: 39°02′12″N 125°43′51″E
- Construction started: 28 August 1987
- Topped-out: 1992
- Estimated completion: Unknown (exterior construction completed: 14 July 2011)

Height
- Roof: 330.02 metres (1,082.7 ft)

Technical details
- Floor count: Above ground 105, underground 3
- Floor area: 360,000 m^{2} (3,900,000 sq ft)

Design and construction
- Architects: Baikdoosan Architects & Engineers
- Developer: Orascom Group

Other information
- Public transit: Hyŏksin: Kŏnsŏl

Korean name
- Hangul: 류경호텔
- Hanja: 柳京호텔
- RR: Ryugyeong hotel
- MR: Ryugyŏng hot'el

The Ryugyong Hotel (Korean: 류경호텔; Hanja: 柳京호텔; RR: Ryugyeong Hotel; MR: Ryugyŏng Hotel), sometimes spelled as Yu-Kyung Hotel, is a 330 m (1,080 ft) tall unfinished pyramid-shaped skyscraper in Pyongyang, North Korea. Its name (lit. "capital of willows") is also one of the historical names for Pyongyang. The building has been planned as a mixed-use development, which would include a hotel.

Construction began in 1987 but was halted in 1992 as North Korea entered a period of economic crisis after the dissolution of the Soviet Union. After 1992, the building stood topped out, but without any windows or interior fittings. In 2008, construction resumed, and the exterior was completed in 2011. The hotel was planned to open in 2012, the centenary of founding leader Kim Il Sung's birth. A partial opening was announced for 2013 and subsequently cancelled. In 2018, an LED display was fitted to one side, which is used to show propaganda animations and film scenes.

== Architecture ==
Comparison of approximate profiles of the Ryugyong Hotel with some notable pyramidal or near-pyramidal buildings. Dotted lines indicate original heights, where data is available. In its SVG file, hover over a pyramid to highlight and click for its article.

The Ryugyong Hotel is 330 m (1,080 ft) tall, making it the most prominent feature of Pyongyang's skyline and the tallest building in North Korea. Construction of the Ryugyong Hotel was intended to be completed in time for the 80th birthday of General Secretary of the Workers' Party of Korea and President Kim Il Sung in 1992; if this had been achieved, it would have held the title of world's tallest hotel. Before Goldin Finance 117 in China, it was considered the tallest unoccupied building in the world.

The building consists of three wings, each measuring 100 m (330 ft) long and 18 m (59 ft) wide, lightly stepped once but otherwise sloping at 75 degrees to the ground, which converge at a common point to form a pinnacle. The building is topped by a truncated cone 40 m (130 ft) wide, consisting of eight floors that are intended to rotate, topped by a further six static floors. The structure was originally intended to house five revolving restaurants, and either 3,000 or 7,665 guest rooms, according to different sources. According to Orascom's Khaled Bichara in 2009, the Ryugyong will not be just a hotel, but rather a mixed-use development, including "revolving restaurant" facilities along with a "mixture of hotel accommodation, apartments and business facilities".

== Construction history ==
=== Beginning ===
The plan for a large hotel was reportedly a Cold War response to the completion of the world's then-tallest hotel, the Westin Stamford Hotel in Singapore, in 1986 by the South Korean company SsangYong Group. North Korean leadership envisioned the project as a channel for Western investors to step into the marketplace. A firm, The Ryugyong Hotel Investment and Management, was established to attract a hoped-for $230 million in foreign investment. A representative for the North Korean government promised relaxed oversight, allowing "foreign investors [to] operate casinos, nightclubs or Japanese lounges". North Korean construction firm Baikdoosan Architects & Engineers (also known as Baekdu Mountain Architects and Engineers) began construction on a pyramid‑shaped hotel in 1987.

The hotel was originally scheduled to be opened to the public in 1992 for the 80th birthday of Kim, but problems with building methods and materials delayed completion. Had it opened on schedule, it would have surpassed the Westin Stamford to become the world's tallest hotel, and would have been the seventh-tallest building in the world. It would have also become the tallest building in the Korean Peninsula, surpassing the 63 Building which was built in 1985. Instead it became the world's tallest abandoned building.

=== Halt ===
In 1992, after the building had reached its full architectural height, work was halted due to the economic crisis in North Korea following the collapse of the Soviet Union. Japanese newspapers estimated the cost of construction was $750 million, consuming 2 percent of North Korea's GDP. For over a decade, the unfinished building sat vacant and without windows, fixtures, or fittings, appearing as a massive concrete shell. A rusting construction crane remained at the top, which the BBC called "a reminder of the totalitarian state's thwarted ambition". According to Marcus Noland, in the late 1990s, the European Chamber of Commerce in Korea inspected the building and concluded that the structure was irreparable. Questions were raised regarding the quality of the building's concrete and the alignment of its elevator shafts, which some sources said were "crooked".

In a 2006 article, ABC News questioned whether North Korea had sufficient raw materials or energy for such a massive project. A North Korean government official told the Los Angeles Times in 2008 that construction was not completed "because [North Korea] ran out of money".

Though mocked-up images of the completed hotel had appeared on North Korean stamps during the initial construction period, the North Korean government ignored the building's existence during the construction hiatus even though it dominated the Pyongyang skyline. The government manipulated official photographs in order to remove the unfinished structure from the skyline, and excluded it from printed maps of Pyongyang.

The halt in construction, the rumours of problems and the mystery about its future led foreign media sources to dub it "the worst building in the world", "Hotel of Doom" and "Phantom Hotel".

=== Resumption ===
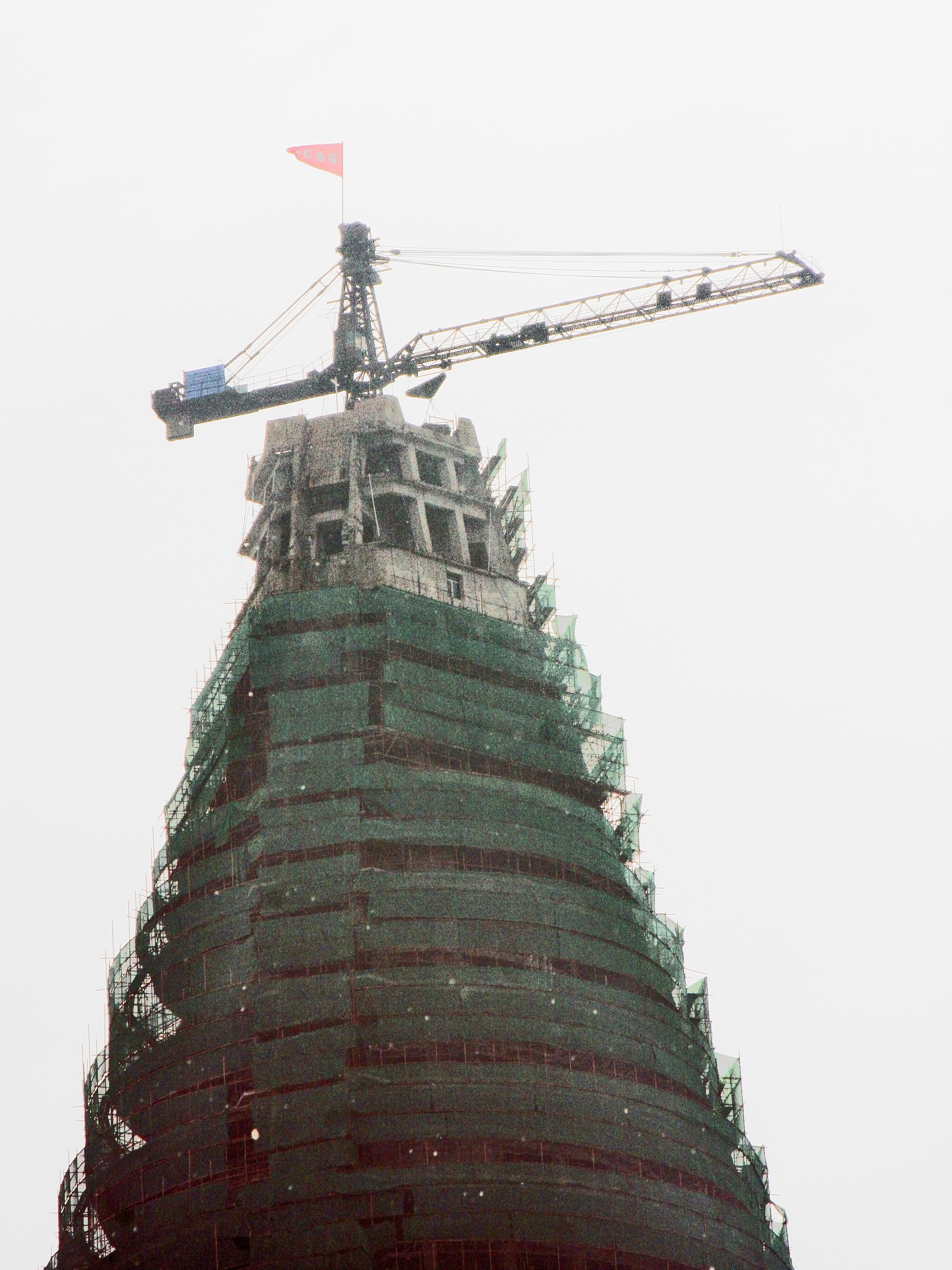
View of the top in September 2008, some time after construction resumed

In April 2008, after 16 years of inactivity, work on the building was restarted by the Egyptian construction firm Orascom PLC. The firm, which had entered into a US$400 million deal with the North Korean government to build and run a cellular network, said that their telecommunications deal was not directly related to the Ryugyong Hotel work. In 2008, North Korean officials stated that the hotel would be completed by 2012, coinciding with the 100th anniversary of the birth of Kim. In 2009, Orascom's chief operating officer Bichara noted that they "had not had too many problems" resolving the reported structural issues of the building, and that a revolving restaurant would be located at the top of the building.

In July 2011, it was reported that the exterior work was complete. Features that Orascom had installed include exterior glass panels and telecommunications antennas. In September 2012, photographs taken by Koryo Tours were released, showing the interior for the first time. The photographs showed no wiring, cabling, or pipes in the structure, which was bare and unfurnished.

=== Opening announced, then cancelled ===
In November 2012, international hotel operator Kempinski announced it would be running the hotel, which was expected to partially open in mid‑2013. In March 2013, plans to open the hotel were suspended. Kempinski clarified its earlier statements, saying that only "initial discussions" had ever occurred, but that no agreement had been signed because "market entry is not currently possible".

Kempinski did not elaborate on its reasons, but commentators suggested that international tensions related to the 2013 North Korean nuclear test, economic risks, and delays in construction probably played a part.

=== Renewal ===
Activity resumed in late 2016 and a representative of Orascom visited North Korea. In 2017 and early 2018, there were signs of work at the site, with access roads being constructed.

In April 2018, a large LED display featuring the North Korean flag had been added to the top of the building. By May, an LED display had been added to one entire side of the structure, and there were reports that the building was being readied for occupation. By July, the LED display was showing animations and movie scenes. In June 2019, there was new signage bearing the hotel's name (in Korean and English) and its logo over the main entrance.

In 2024, the North Korean government reportedly started to look for a casino operator willing to complete the building in exchange for profits made by the casino.

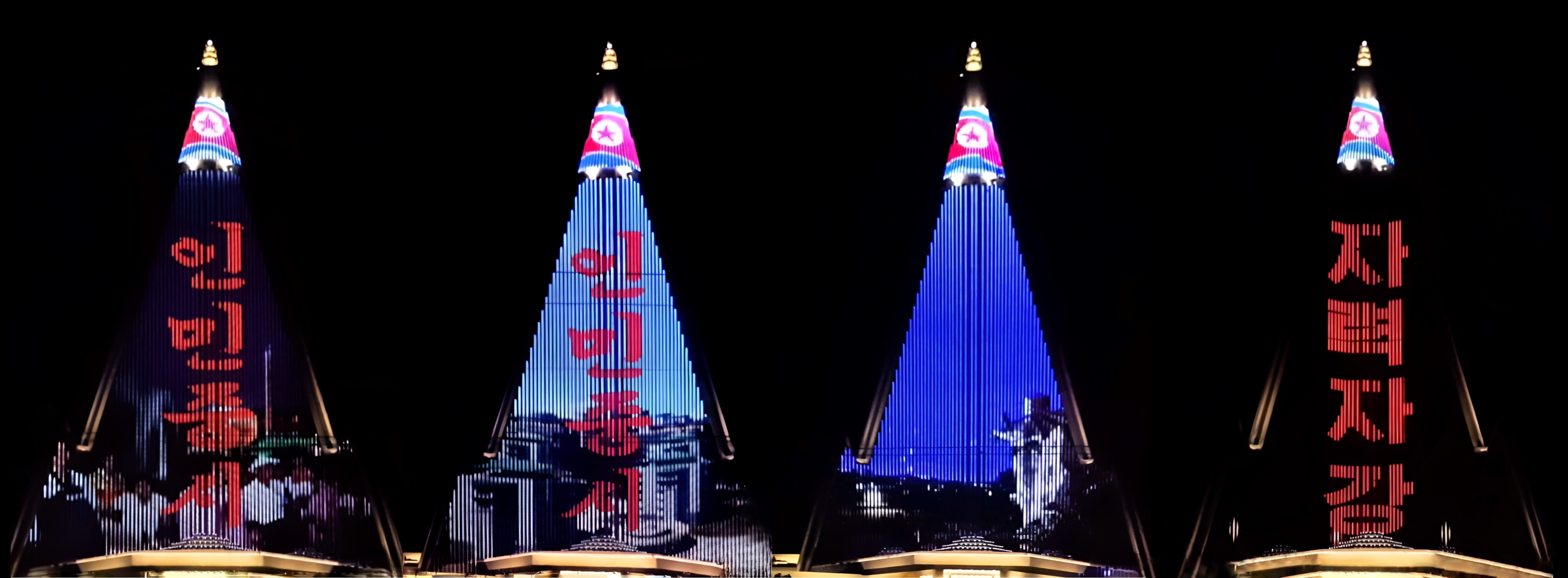
Pictures of the LED-Nightshow in 2019

== Gallery ==
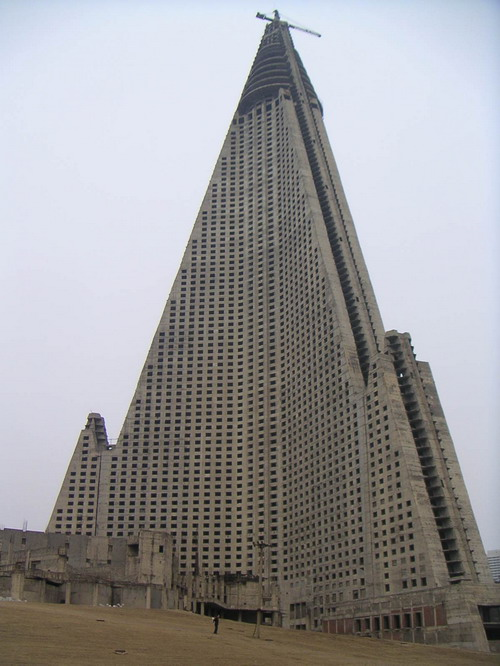
March 2004

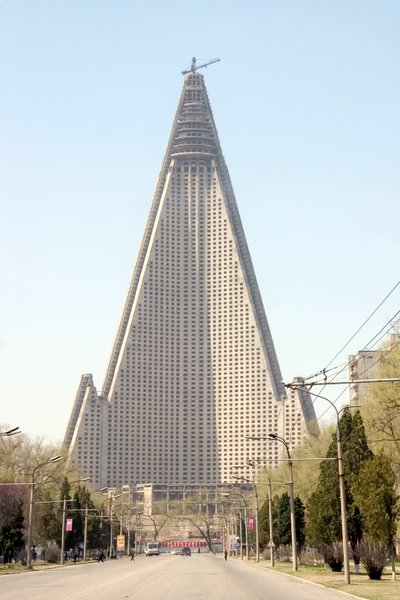
April 2005

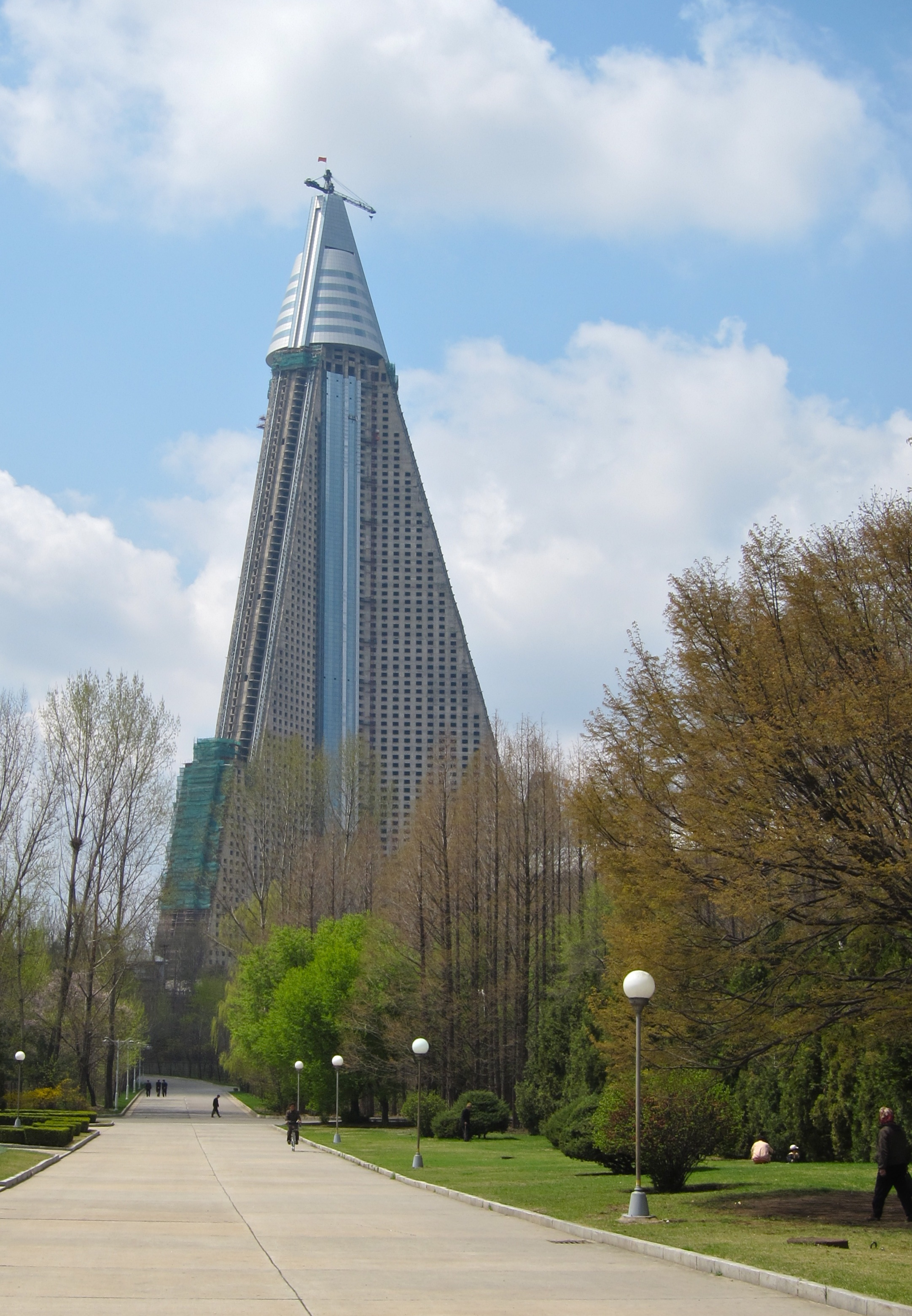
April 29, 2010

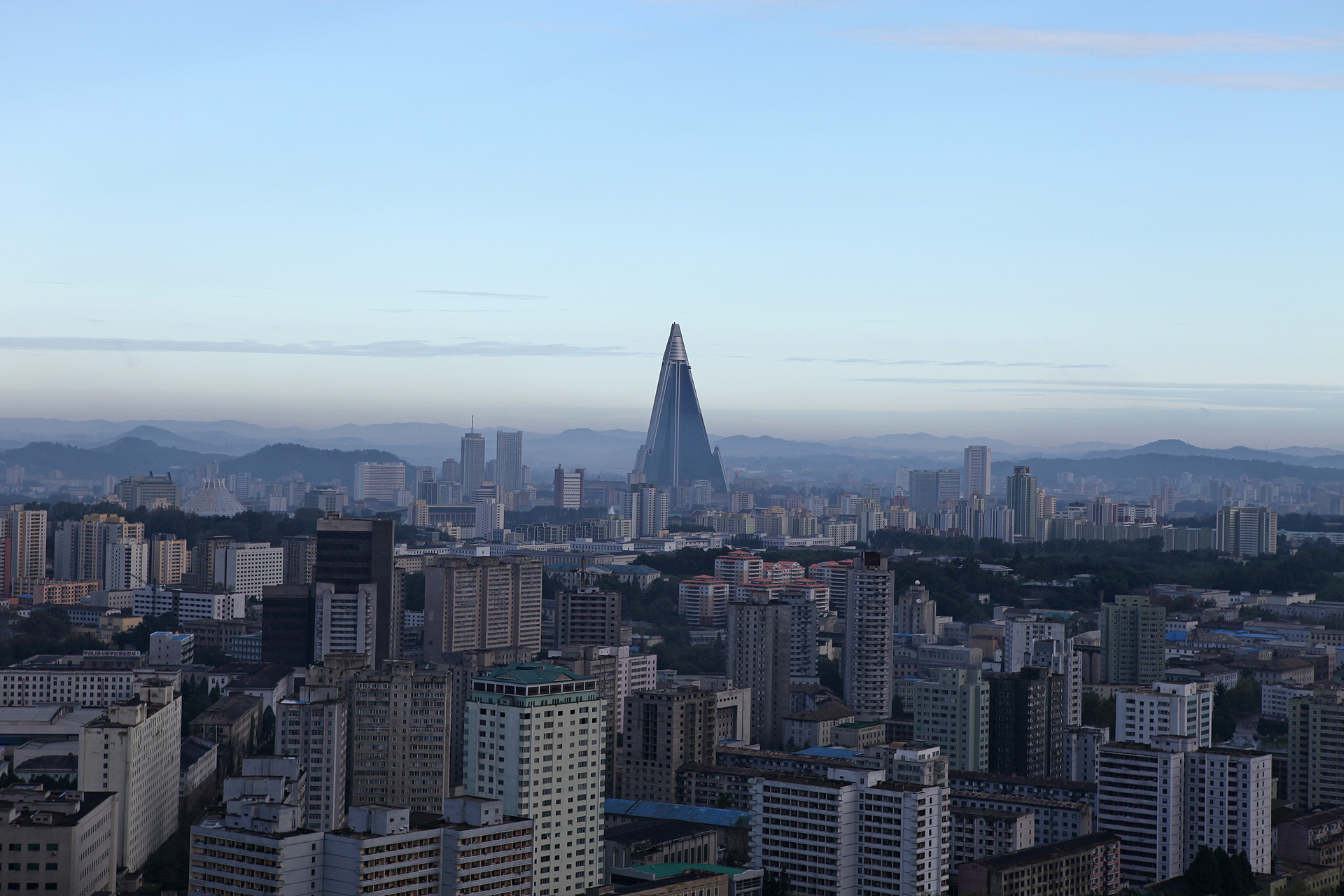
September 11, 2010

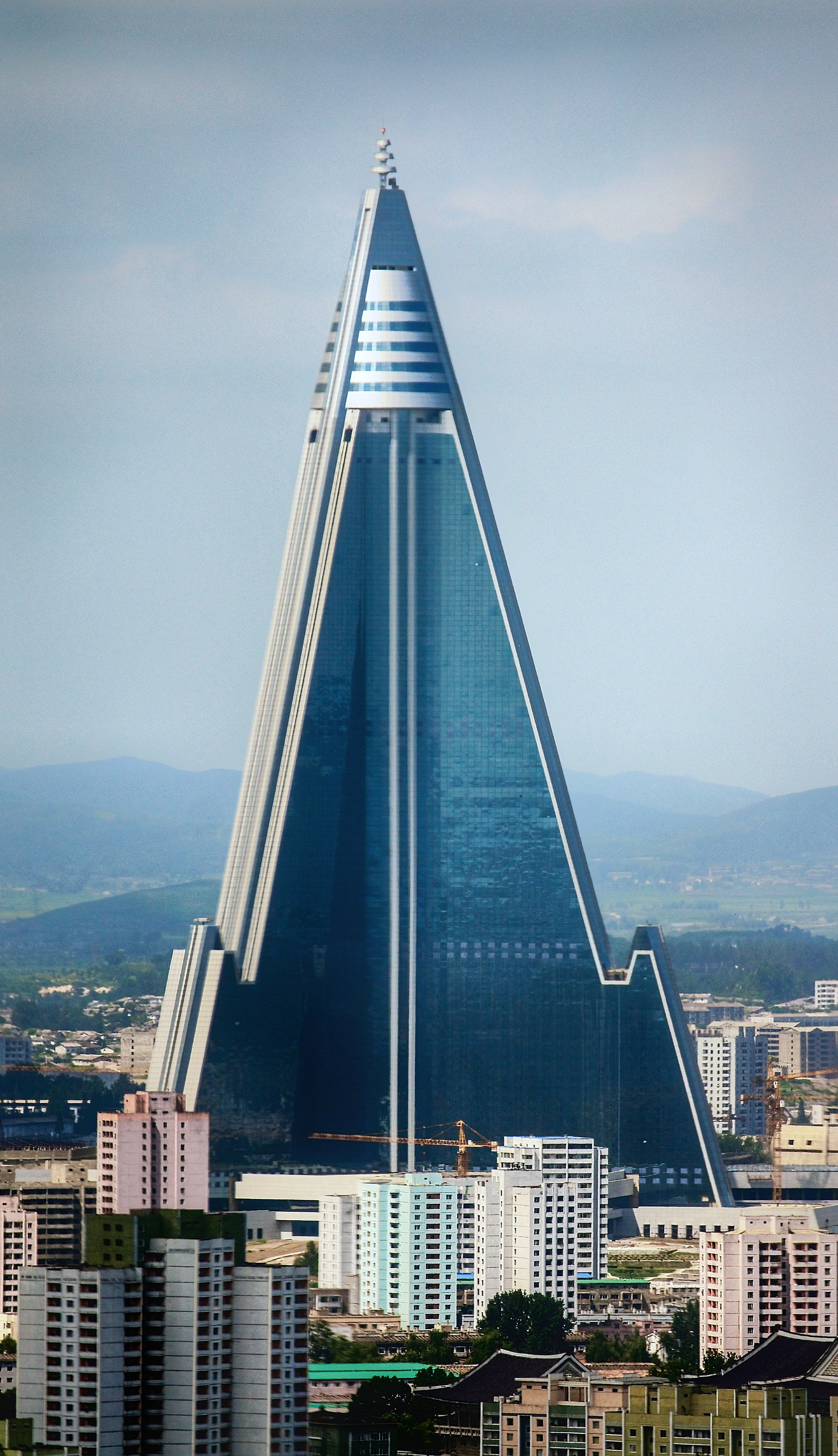
August 27, 2011

== See also ==
- Korean architecture
- List of buildings with 100 floors or more
- List of hotels in North Korea
- List of tallest buildings in North Korea
- List of tallest hotels
- List of skyscrapers by floor area
