= Hwanggumbol station =

Pyongyang Metro station

Hwanggŭmbŏl Station 황금벌
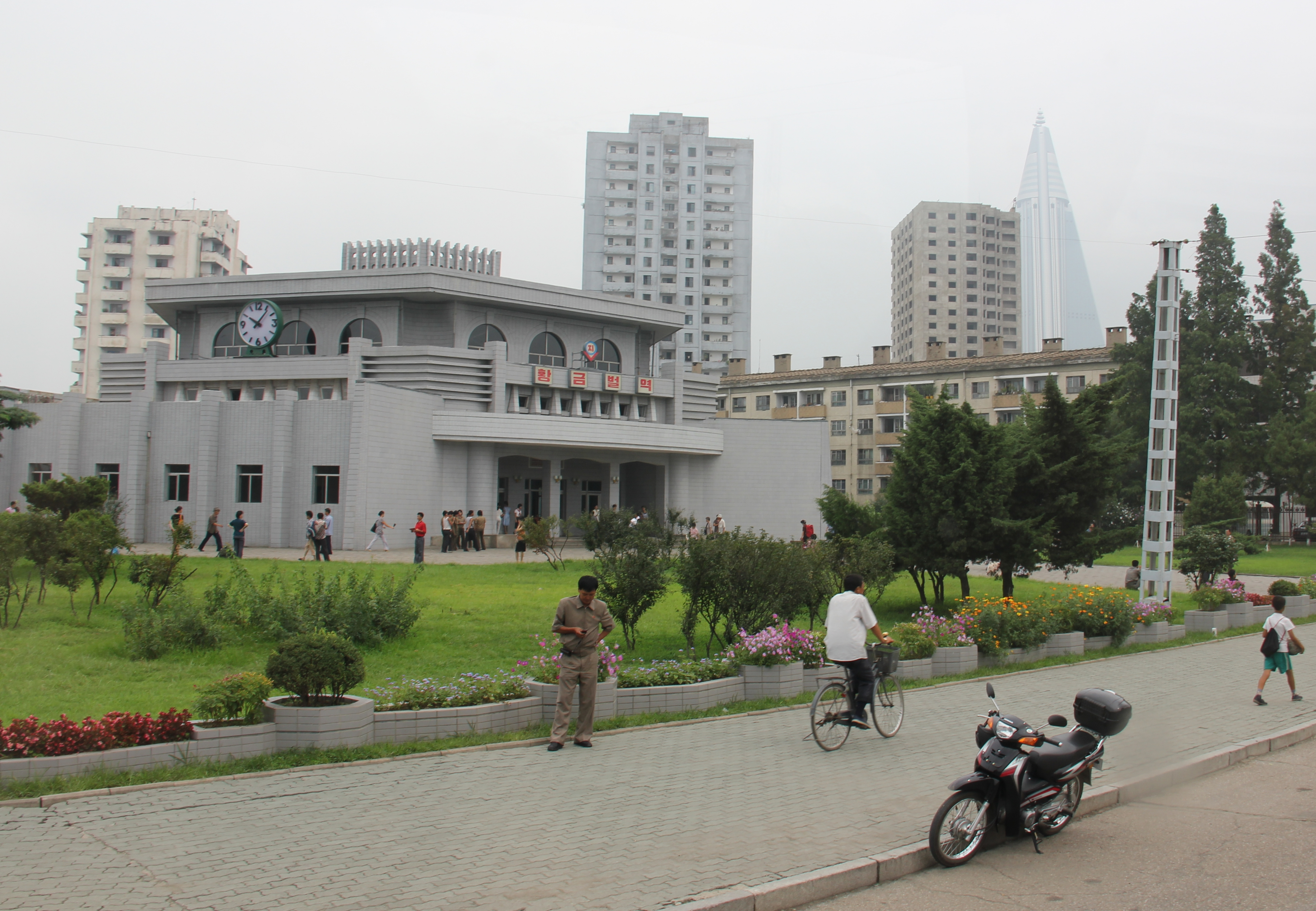

General information
- Location: Potonggang-guyok, Pyongyang; Democratic People's Republic of Korea
- Coordinates: 39°1′39.2″N 125°43′34.6″E
- Platforms: 1
- Tracks: 2

History
- Opened: 6 September 1978

Services
| Preceding station | Pyongyang Metro | Following station |
|---|---|---|
| Konguk towards Kwangbok | Hyoksin Line | Konsol towards Ragwon |
Location

Hwanggŭmbŏl Station (Korean: 황금벌역; Hanja: 黃金벌驛) is a station on Hyŏksin Line of the Pyongyang Metro.

The station is next to a park and short distance from Sinso Bridge crossing the Potong River.

The station is the terminus of trolleybuses line 8, from Hwanggŭmbŏl station to the Arch of Triumph.
