= Trams and trolleybuses in North Korea =

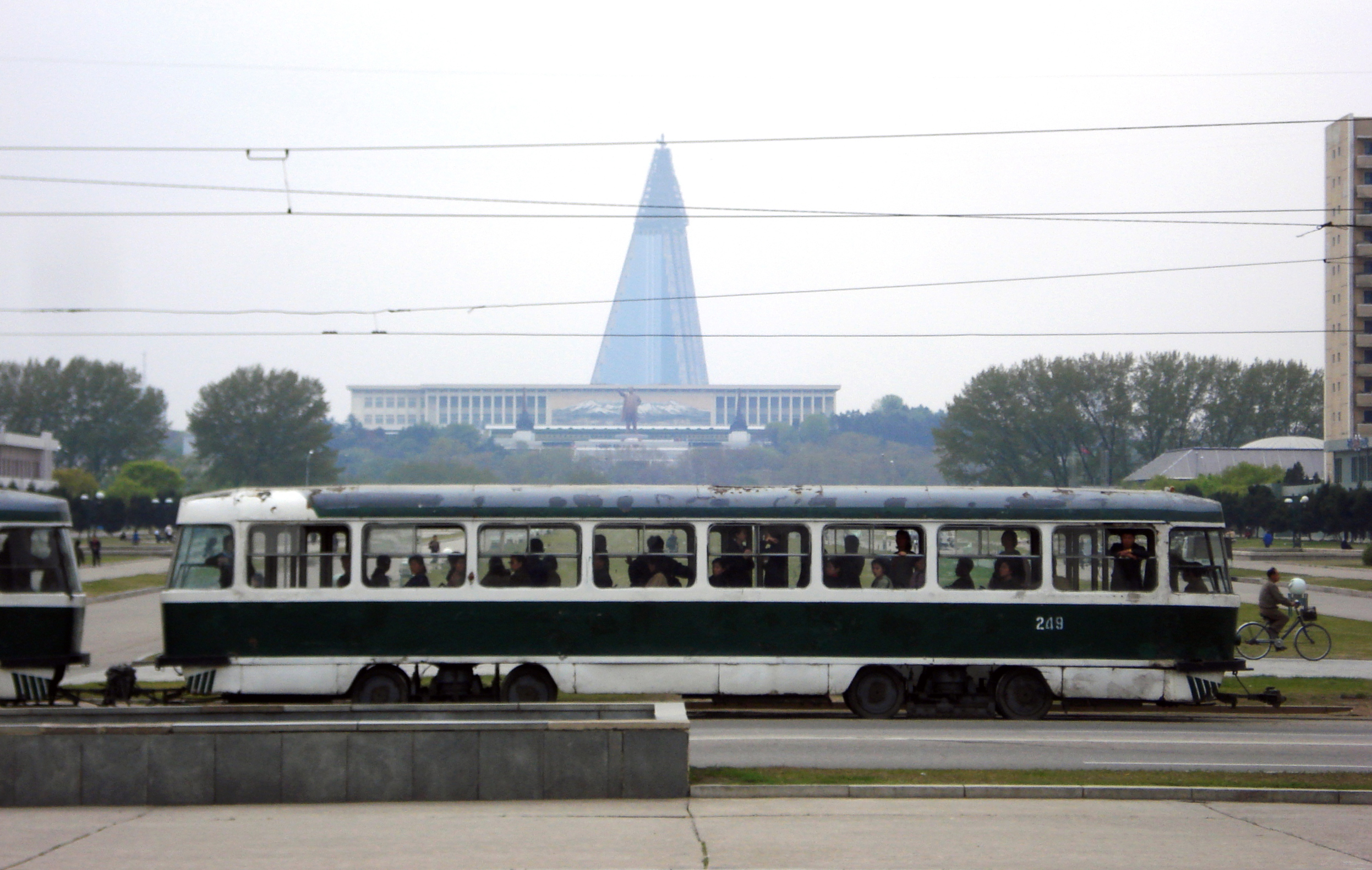
Pyongyang tram in 2009

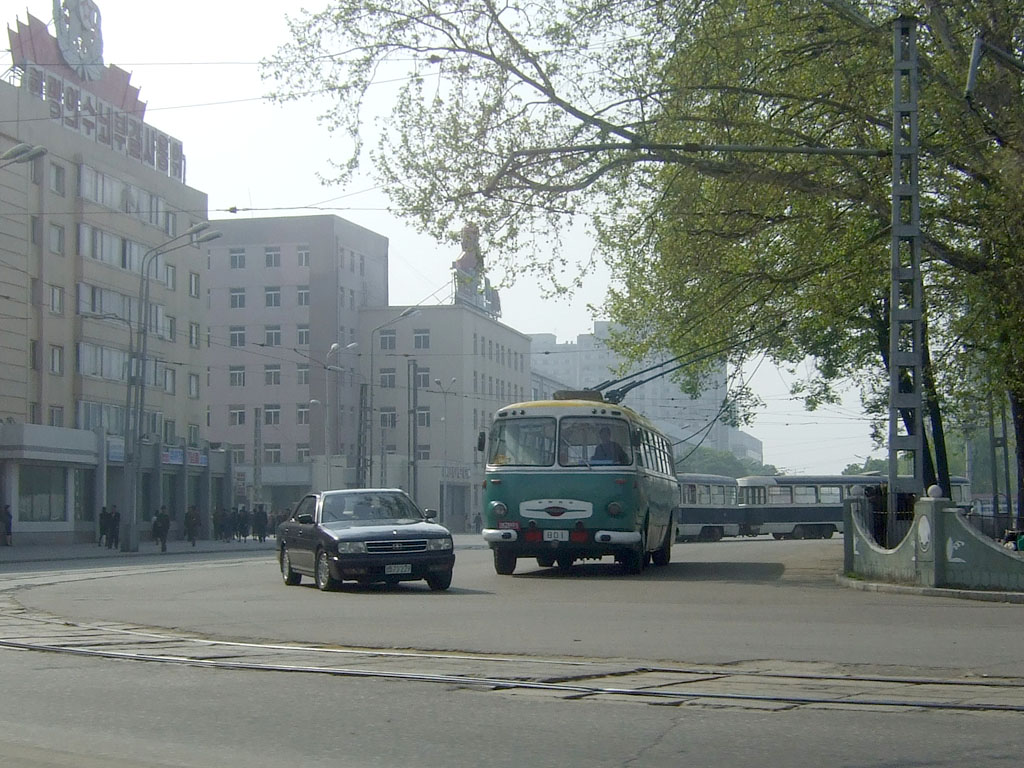
Pyongyang Trolleybus near Pyongyang Station in 2007

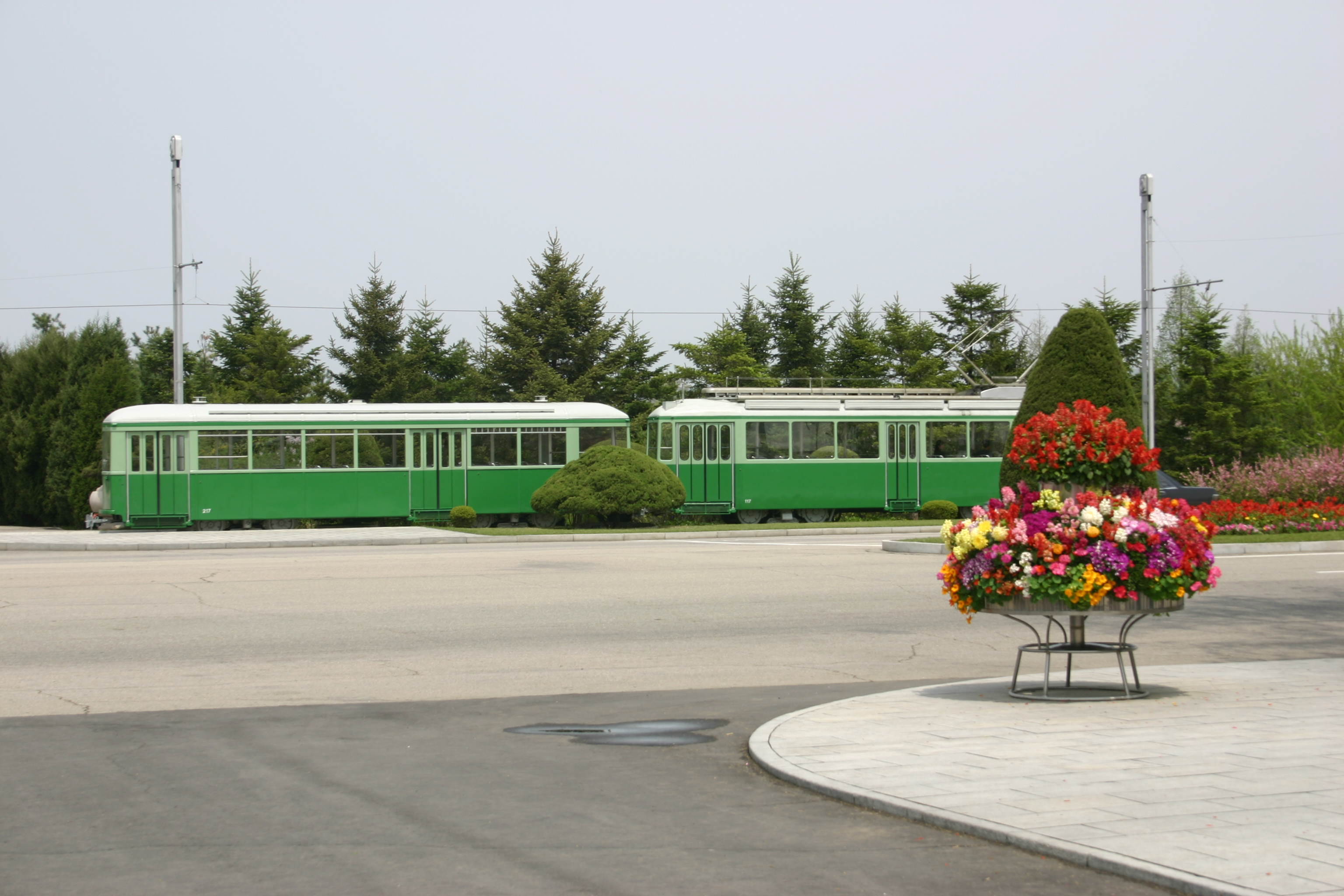
Former Zurich type Be 4/4 tram on the Kumsusan Memorial Palace line

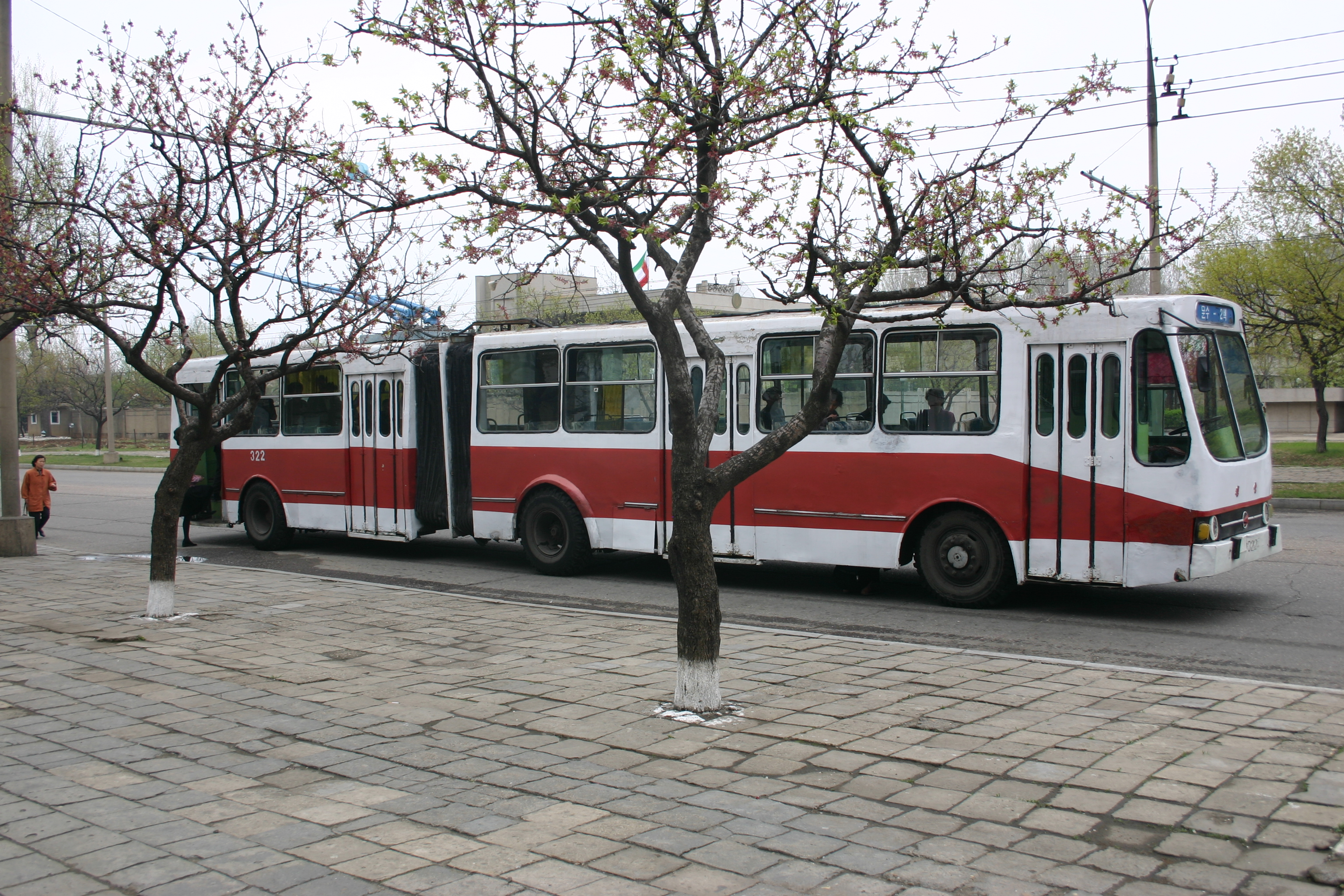
A Pyongyang Trolleybus Factory Chollima 90

Trams and trolleybuses in North Korea are forms of public transportation for North Koreans to travel around in urban centres given the fuel shortages and lack of access to cars for average citizens.

Very few details are known about these trolleybuses and trams due to the country's isolation. Pyongyang, Wonsan and Chongjin are the only cities known to have tramways.

For a full list of trolleybus systems in North Korea, see List of trolleybus systems in North Korea.

== Trams ==
Product list and details
Fleet Size	Description	Make	Fleet #	Year acquired	Notes
45	double-articulated	Czech Republic ČKD Tatra KT8D5K units	1001–3023	1990	Delivered new
129	trams	Czech Republic ČKD Tatra T6B5K single motor units	1046–1174	1990s	Delivered new At least two vehicles have 'Pulgungi 2.16' labelling on front; these vehicles have significant less switches behind the driver and different electrical equipment.
50	articulated trams	China Shenyang ST4 units	1175–1233 not all numbers used	ordered 1991	Modified derivative of Tatra KT4 built in China, articulation later removed due to structural defects and subsequently withdrawn in 1999. Bodies were rebuilt into Chollima 971/961 trolleybuses. 2.5 meters wide instead of 2.2 on normal KT4, 45 kW motors compared to 40 on KT4. 150 cars were ordered but apparently only 50 were delivered. Some vehicles likely underwent body replacement in Chongjin.
160 motor units and 160 trailers	trams	Czech Republic ČKD Tatra T4D/B4D single motor units	2000-3000s	ordered 1998	used trams from Leipzig (200 vehicles), Dresden (95), and Magdeburg (25). Ordered to replace ST4. Only operating on line 2 and 3, some cars have been withdrawn. Formerly operated on line 1.
20	trams	Czech Republic ČKD Tatra T3/T3SUCS single motor units	1178-1204; 178-204	ordered 2008	Only operates on Line 1, some fleet numbers are not in use.
1 + 1 trailer	articulated trams	North Korea Kim Chŏng-tae Electric Locomotive Works – modification of Shenyang ST4 named '7.17' or 'Chongnyonjonwi'		1991	Prototype vehicle, not in service. Occasionally displayed at Three Revolutions Exhibition.
18 trailers and 18 motor units	two-car married sets, each car having two trucks	Switzerland. Built 1947–1954, powered cars by Maschinenfabrik Oerlikon (MFO), BBC and SWS, matching trailers by SIG, for the Zürich tram system		retired by Zürich in 1994; purchased by North Korea in 1995	used on a metre gauge line from Samhung metro station to Kumsusan Memorial Palace in Pyongyang (all other lines are standard gauge)
≥15	double articulated	North Korea Pyongyang Bus Repair Factory 'Thongil-181'	1003-1024, 2014, 3013- 3073, not all numbers used	2018-	Only 1003 is a bidirectional vehicle, all others have cabs on one side only; configurations in pantographs, rear view mirrors vary. Uses alternating current motors.
?	single unit tram	(North Korea) Kim Chong-t'ae Electric Locomotive Works		2020-	Narrow gauge trams (1000mm or 1067mm) for Wonsan.
≥6	single unit tram	(North Korea) Chongjin Bus Repair Factory	1115-1138, not all numbers used	1999-	Four axle tram resembling Tatra T6, but longer. Three doors on right side. No roof equipment. Most likely are body replacements of Shenyang ST4.
≥1	articulated tram	(North Korea) Chongjin Bus Repair Factory(청진뻐스수리공장)			Similar to above tram, but joined at the middle with a Jacobs bogie with six axles in total. Only the front and middle bogies have track brakes. Resembles a longer KT8D5K but without the middle section. Only one built.

== Trolleybuses ==
The Pyongyang trolleybus system has been operating since 1962, with a large fleet serving several routes. Due to the closed nature of North Korea, the existence of trolleybus networks in other North Korean cities was generally unknown outside the country for many years, but it is now known that around 12 to 15 other cities also possess trolleybus systems, among them Sariwon, Wonsan, Chongjin and Pyongsong. A few other places have very small (in some cases only one or two vehicles) systems for transporting workers from a housing area to a nearby coal mine or other industrial site—or at least did at some time within recent years, such as the city of Sangnong. Trolleybuses include both imported and locally made vehicles but are mostly locally made, converted or rebuilt. There are a few local manufacturers of trolleybuses.

The trolleybus network in Wonsan was revived during 2018–19, Sinuiju in 2020, and a new system opened in Manpo in 2019. According to The Pyongyang Times, new trolleybuses are still being constructed.

=== Pyongyang Trolleybus Factory ===
#	Description	Make	Fleet #	Years operational	Notes
≥3	trolleybus	Chollima 9.11	612, 654, 683	1961–late 1980s	#612 preserved as museum vehicle in Pyongyang Trolleybus Factory. It was visited by Kim Il Sung before the formal commencement of Trolleybuses in Pyongyang. Strongly resembles the Jinghua BK540. The first trolleybuses built at Pyongyang Trolley Bus Factory were directly based on the Jinghua BK540. Named in honour of 9.11 1948, when the DPRK was formed, and presented as a gift to the 4th Congress of the Workers' Party of Korea.
≥2	articulated trolleybus	Chollima 9.25	903, 968*	1963–	Only one preserved vehicle still in use. Based on LAZ-695. #903 is the 'honorary' trolleybus of Ryonmot depot. Some transferred to Kowon (now Sudong) and Chongjin in the 1970s. Number 903 has been preserved as an honorary vehicle of Ryonmot depot, as Kim Il Sung rode it on 15 May 1964 and Kim Jong Il rode it on 14 May 1964. The trolleybus has a monocoque body with three doors on the right side. A special service trolleybus was developed on the basis of Chollima 9.25, using the front section it.
≥7	trolleybus	Chollima 70	106, 118, 184, 801, 819	1970–	Exterior based on Škoda 706 RTO. Partially withdrawn, a number of 'honorary' vehicles remain in service. Presumably produced until 1974, as it was listed in the Foreign Trade of the DPRK in 1974.
1	trolleybus	Chollima 72	200	1972–	One vehicle preserved as the 'honorary' trolleybus of West Pyongyang depot.
	trolleybus	Chollima 74 KA		1974–-	Also operates in Nampo. The production of the Chollima-74 series lasted until 1984.
	trolleybus	Chollima 74 NA		1974–-	Also operates in Nampo. The production of the Chollima-74 series lasted until 1984.
	trolleybus	Chollima 74 'Mangyongdae-ho 1979'		1979–	Narrow doors in the layout of the first version and decorated with the letters '만 경 대 호 1979'.
	trolleybus	Chollima 82/84		1982–	Some trolleybuses in Sinuiju are refurbished with new Chollima-321 based bodies. One vehicle still operates as a work vehicle with a maintenance tower in Pyongyang.
	trolleybus	unknown			Purpose-built cargo trolleybus with right-hand drive.
	articulated trolleybus	Chollima 842		1984–	Similar to the later Chollima 862가
	articulated trolleybus	Chollima 862가		1986–	Some withdrawn. #281 is an honorary trolleybus of Sanghung depot, as Kim Il Sung rode it on 18 April 1989. Similar design to the Chollima 82/84.
	articulated trolleybus	Chollima 90/903		1990–	Both are similar and work in Pyongyang. These trolleybuses were also known as Sogiryon, after So Gi-ryon, a Chongryon member who donated the funds for constructing these trolleybuses.
	trolleybus	Chollima 901		1990s–	Non-articulate variant of Chollima 90/903. 95 kW engine.
	trolleybus	Chollima 902		1990s–	110 kW engine.
	trolleybus	Chongnyonjunwi/ Chollima 973		1997–	Designation applies to electrifications of Karosa B731, B732, Karosa C734. Used in Pyongyang, Pyongsong and Sangwon.
	articulated trolleybus	Chollima 971/ Chongnyonjonwi/ Sonyon		1997–	Three axle articulated trolleybus, body from withdrawn Shenyang ST4 trams. Mostly withdrawn. Trailer removed on some vehicle to become Chollima 961
	articulated trolleybus	Chollima 961/ Sonyon		1999–	Body from withdrawn Shenyang ST4 trams. Similar to Chollima 971, but as a single car.
	trolleybus	Ikarus 260 (Chollima 951)		1990s–	Converted from diesel, one Ikarus 260 was converted to a solar powered vehicle in Nampo. Works in Pyongsong and Pyongyang
≈2	trolleybus	Ikarus 255 (Chollima 951)	506, 589	1990s–	589 is a work car with overhead maintenance tower.
≥6	articulated trolleybus	Ikarus 280 (Chollima 952)	326, 525, 212, 442, 243, 1165, ?	1990s–	Likely converted from diesel Ikarus 280 due to lack of roof equipment. Works in Sariwon and are the only two trolleybuses in service there.
≈0	articulated trolleybus	Chollima Kwangboksonyon		1992–2015	Similar to the Chollima 903 but without front door. One door in front section and two in rear section. Might have featured a hybrid drive due to having a gas tank. Built in small numbers. Mostly withdrawn.
1	articulated trolleybus/ trolleybus	Chollima 011/ Kangsongdaeguk	411, 509	2002 or 2005	Only two built. Articulated trolleybus scrapped (411). Other single unit (509) still in use. The trolleybus museum in the Pyongyang Trolleybus Factory instead has the name 'Kangsondaeguk' for the articulated trolleybus.
>190	articulated trolleybus	Chollima-091		2009–	Variant with flatter front exists. One vehicle has double width front door. One vehicle kept as stationary display in Three Revolutions Exhibition.
≥20	trolleybus	Chollima-316		2017–	First trolleybus with battery power storage, located under the floor, first trolleybus with LED display, 3 doors, with a domestication rate of 92%. A few early vehicles did not have a rear door. The vehicles are distributed among the lines in Pyongyang, with each line having one to three vehicles.
≥44	trolleybus	Chollima-321		July 2018–	Has battery power storage, LED display, 3 doors. Incorrectly named as Mallima-312 in other sources. Later production versions has longer and straighter side view mirror. Used in Pyongyang, Wonsan, Kanggye and Huichon and possibly in Manpo. Uses CNHTC axles
≥44	trolleybus	Chollima-321		Oct 2020–	A body is used in Sinuiju most likely on the chassis of a Chollima 82/84, with MAZ-200/KrAZ-222/Jaju-64 axles.
≥22	articulated trolleybus	Chollima-518		2023–	Two versions exist — the Chollima-518/1, with external design inspired by Mercedes-Benz Future Bus concept, and the less-appealing Chollima-518/2, which appears to be modelled after the previous version of Van Hool Exquicity.

=== Chongjin Bus Factory ===
#	Description	Make	Fleet #	Year acquired	Year retired	Notes
≈15	trolleybus	Jipsan 74		1972		Some rebuilt.
0	articulated trolleybus	Jipsan 85		1985-90		Three axle articulated trolleybus.
≈4	trolleybus	Jipsan 88		1988		Similar to the Jipsam 74.
≈5	trolleybus	Jipsan (rebuild)				Exterior strongly resembles Tatra T6
≥2	trolleybus	Jipsan		2019		In 2019, two variants were produced; both were painted in blue and white, with the main difference in the curvature of the front. The 2019 vehicles were probably body replacements of old vehicles.
20	trolleybus	Jipsan		2020, 2021		2020 first series had three doors, bearing more resemblance to the Chollima-321. Another series of these trolleybuses were built in 2021; the differentiating feature to the 2020 series was that it featured a 'y' shaped arch above the front wheel, similarly to the Chollima-321 which the earlier series lacked.

=== Others ===
#	Description	Make	Fleet #	Year acquired	Year retired	Notes
≥6 built	trolleybus	4 June Rolling Stock Works Songdowon	101-107 except for 104	Late 1970s		Named after local area in Wonsan. Most likely entirely replaced by Chollima-321 sent to Kangwon Province as a gift by Kim Jong Un in April 2019. Some have undergone a body replacement before being likely withdrawn.
≥22	trolleybus	Sinhungho		Late 1980s	refurbished through complete body replacement	Some rebuilt with newer bodies into (II) and (III). Only operates in Hamhung-Hungnam region. Some fitted with working towers on top for overhead maintenance purposes. Mistakenly called Chongnyonho.
≥22	trolleybus	Sinhungho		Before 2016		
≥22	trolleybus	Sinhungho		2016		Produced until about 2019, design inspired by Chollima-091
≥22	trolleybus	Sinhungho		2019		design inspired by Chollima-321 but built with MAZ-200/KrAZ-222/Jaju-64 axles
3	trolleybus	Pyongsong 'Chollima'	2161, 2166, 2167	2019		Built with assistance from Pyongyang Trolleybus Factory. 2161 is more flat at the front than 2166–7.
	trolleybus	Chavdar 11G5				at least 1 electrified bus existed in Sinuiju

== See also ==
- Pyongyang Metro
- Pyongyang Tram
- Transport in North Korea
- Trolleybus usage by country
