= Trolleybuses in Pyongyang =

Public transport network in Pyongyang, North Korea

Pyongyang trolleybus system
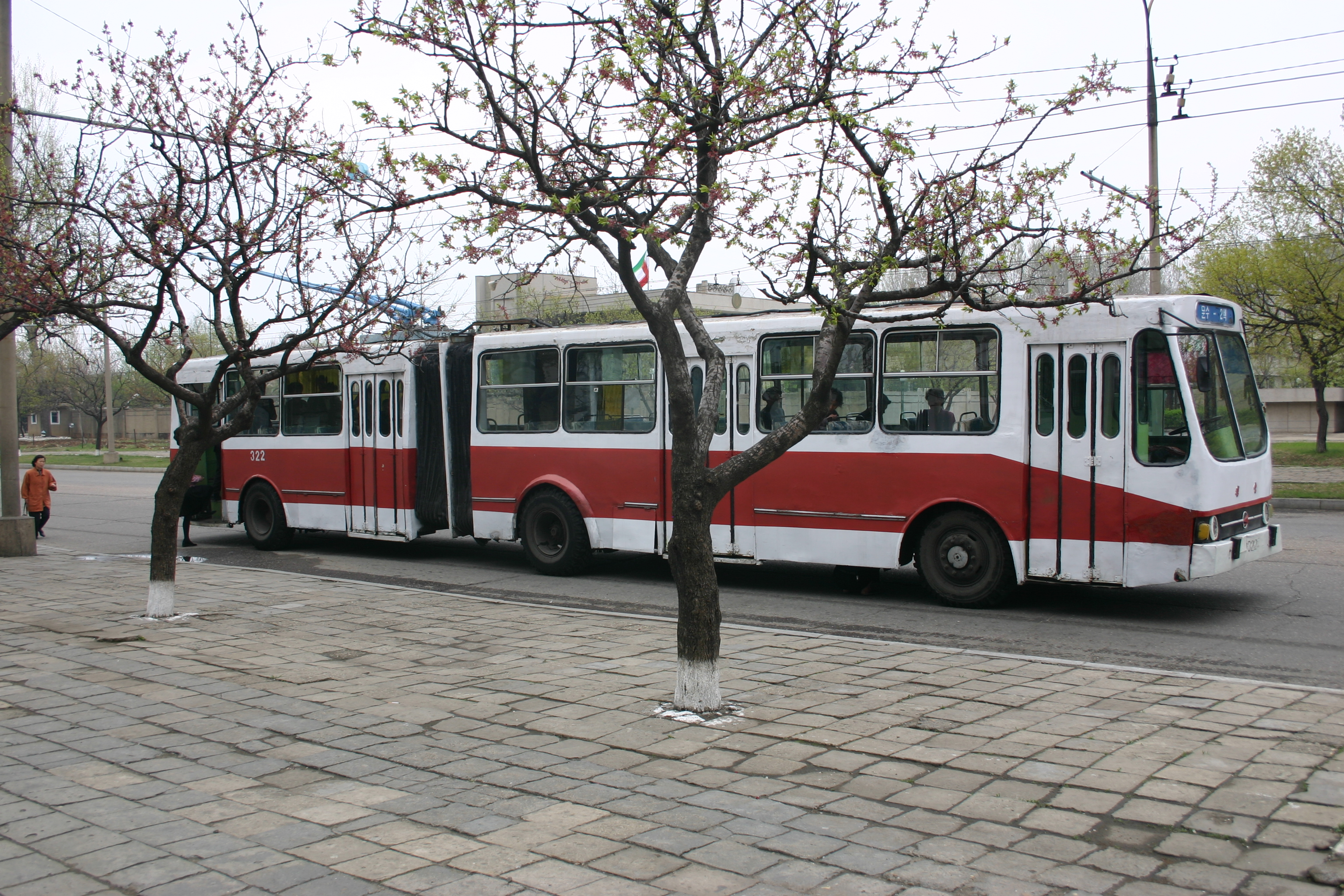
- Pyongyang Trolleybus Factory Chollima 90 trolleybus.

Operation
- Locale: Pyongyang, North Korea
- Open: 1962
- Status: Active
- Lines: 12
- Operator: Capital City Passenger Transport Company

Infrastructure
- Electrification: 600V DC
- Depots: Ryonmot Trolley Bus Office; Phyongchon Trolley Bus Office; Munsu Trolley Bus Office; Songsin Trolleybus Office; Kwangmyong-dong
- Stock: At least 370 trolleybuses

Statistics
- Track length (total): 56.6 km (35.2 mi)

The Pyongyang trolleybus system (Korean: 평양 무궤도전차) forms part of the public transport network of Pyongyang, the capital city of North Korea, and extends to some of its suburbs.

== History ==
The first plans for a trolleybus network were proposed in 1957, though construction only began in 1960, after Kim Il Sung ordered it. The network begun operation on 30 April 1962, with an opening ceremony at Pyongyang Railway station to commemorate the opening of the line from the Three Revolutions Exhibition at Ryonmot-dong to the railway station. The network began without a depot; trolleybuses were parked in the open. In September 1963, the Pyongyang station to Arch of Triumph. In the second half of 1964, a line from Moranbong to Palgol opened. By the end of 1964, the fleet consisted of 130 Chollima-9.11 and 24 Chollima 9.25 articulated trolleybuses. Two lines opened in 1965: from Pyongyang station to West Pyongyang on 6 April and from Department Store No. 1 to Taedonggang station on 25 August. During that time, there were also alleged plans for the construction of an intercity line to Pyongsong. Since then, a number of routes have been abolished, replaced by the tram system, though with the closure of tram line 1 from Songsin to Songyo, this section was rebuilt as a trolleybus line. The system is continuously developed, with a new depot serving line 1 and 10 vehicles built in 2016.

The first closures occurred in the 1970s, due to the opening of the Pyongyang Metro. This was followed by a resurgence in the 1980s, when four new routes opened. Closures occurred again in the 1990s due to the opening of the tram network in Pyongyang.^{page:77}

Between 1996 and 2005, part of the trolleybus line in Pyongsong was cut off from the rest of the line, with the area where the line belonged to being transferred to Unjong-guyok of Pyongyang.

In 2020, the total route length was about 62.6 km (38.9 mi) and comprised 11 routes.

During the 2022 Day of the Sun celebrations, a new line from Songyo to Songhwa was opened, while the line from West Pyongyang to Thermal Power was rerouted, both to serve the new Songhwa and Kyongru-dong residentials districts that they respectively pass through, providing convenient transport to the residents of the new districts.

== Services ==
There are a total of 10 lines in operation. Some former lines were replaced by the tram system that opened in 1989. The numbers indicated on the dashboard are not route numbers – they are the stopping pattern of that service. This was implemented in July 1972, when Kim Il Sung sought to reduce traffic jams of trolleybuses, after trolleybus headways were decreased in 1 minute in April 1972.^{page:75}

Route number	Origin	Destination	Notes
1	Ryonmot-dong (련못동)	Pyongyang Railway station (평양역)	
2	West Pyongyang (서평양)	Pyongyang Railway station (평양역)	Trolleybuses do not actually reach the railway station; instead it turns around at West Pyongyang depot.
3	Thermal Power (화력)	West Pyongyang (서평양)	Trolleybuses do not actually reach the railway station; instead it turns around at West Pyongyang depot. It was rerouted as part of the opening of Kyongru-dong residential development, now travelling along Yongung Street and Hyoksin Street, instead of Moranbong Street, Inhung Street and Ponghwa Street.
4	Songsin (송신)	Songyo (선교)	Replaced tram line 1 in its route on the right bank when its section from Songsin to Pyongyang railway station closed.
4 (old)	Hwanggumbol station (황금벌)	Songsin station (송신역)	Former line 4 ran from Songsin railway station to Hwanggumbol metro station, replaced by tram line 1 until section over Taedong River closed.
	Songyo (선교)	Songhwa (송화)	Newest line, opened to serve the 10,000 residential development at Songhwa Street.
5	Munsu (문수)	Department Store No.2 (2백)	Currently runs on Sangwon street
5 (old)	East Pyongyang Grand Theatre (동평양 대극장)	Department Store No. 1 (1백)	
6	Sadong (사동)	Department Store No.1 (1백)	
7	Rangrang (락랑)	Munsu (문수)	Closed, replaced by tram line 2
8	Hwanggumbol metro station (황금벌)	Arch of Triumph (개선문)	Connects Hwanggumbol metro station to Kaesong station.
8 (old)	Kwangbok station (광복역)	Moranbong (모란봉)	Closed section replaced by tram line 1
9	Ryonmot-dong (련못동)	Ryongsong (룡성)	Line to outskirts of Pyongyang
10	Pyongyang Railway station (평양역)	Sci-Tech Complex (과학기술전당)	Runs through Mirae Scientists Street.
10 (old)	Palgol (팔골)	Rangrang (락랑)	Closed, replaced by tram line 1 and 3
11	West Pyongyang (서평양)	Sopo (서포)	
	Kwangmyong-dong (광명동)	Paesan-dong (배산동)	Completely separate line, formerly part of Pyongsong.

== Fleet ==
Most of the vehicles used on the system are North Korean made; some of them based on the Czech Karosa buses. The fleet also includes Hungarian Ikarus trolleybuses, imported as diesel buses and later reconstructed into trolleybuses.

For the full list including vehicles in use in other cities, see Trolleybuses in North Korea. The only trolleybus operated in Pyongyang that was not manufactured by Pyongyang Trolleybus Factory was a single Jipsan-85 articulated trolleybus.

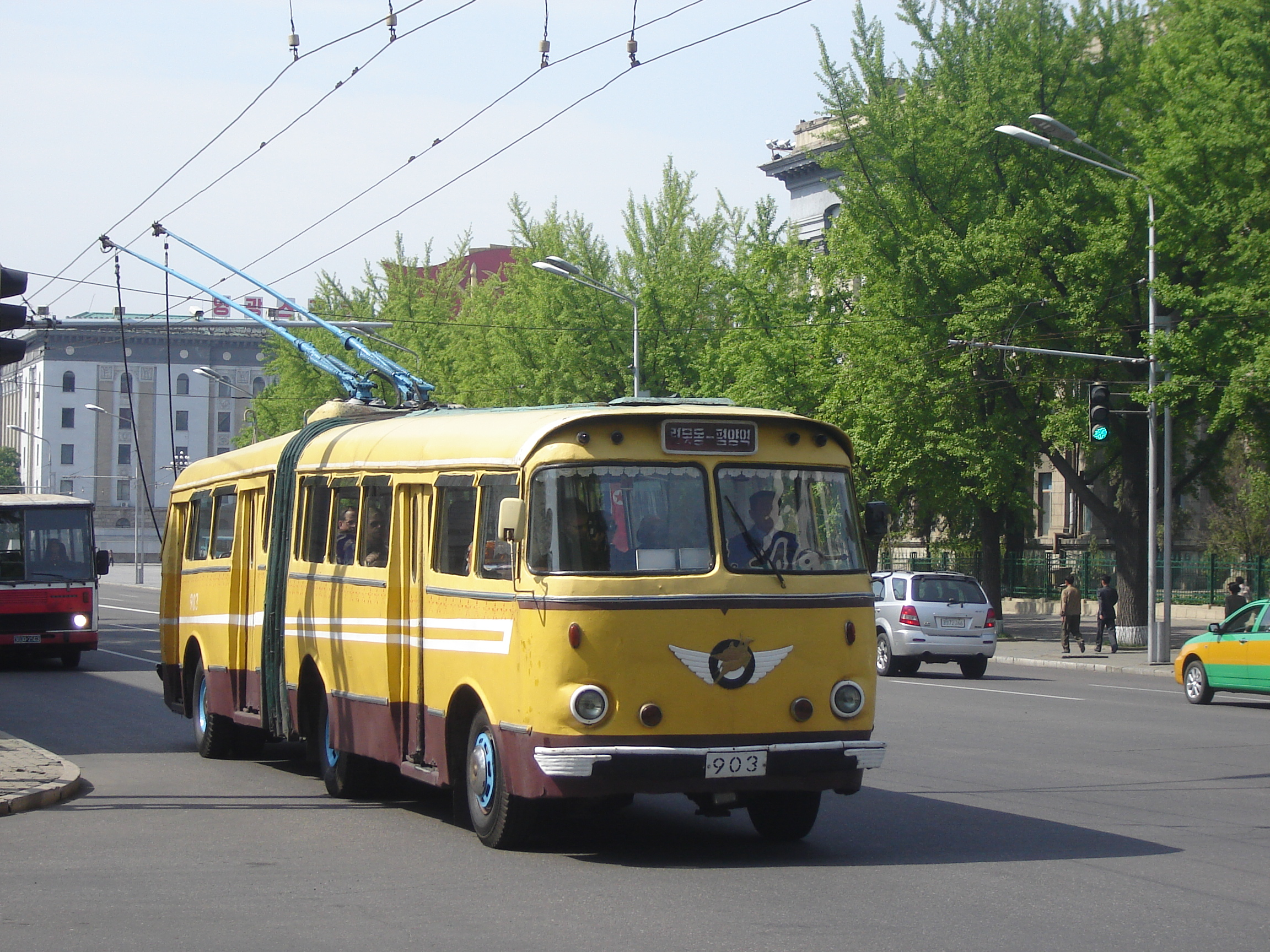
A Chollima 9.25 built in 1964

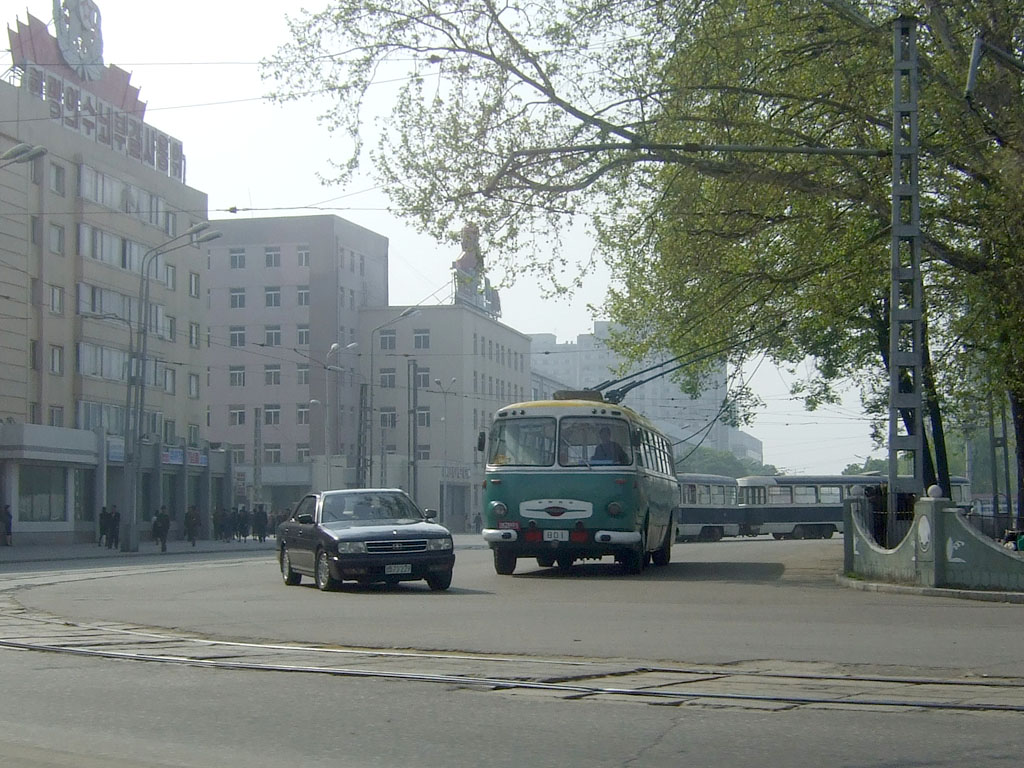
Chollima-70 #801 outside the Pyongyang Station

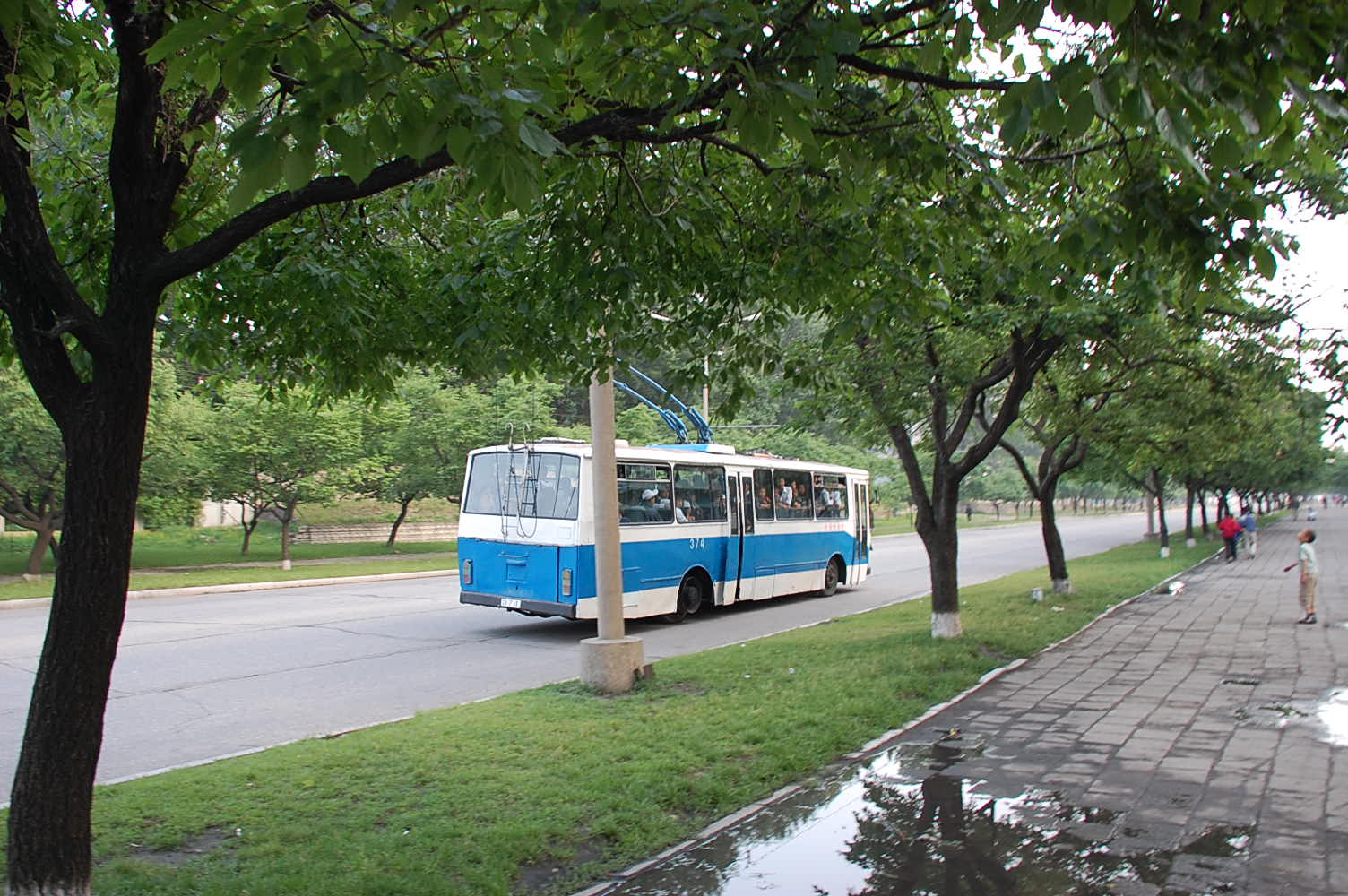
A Chollima 973 trolleybus converted from a Karosa C734 diesel bus

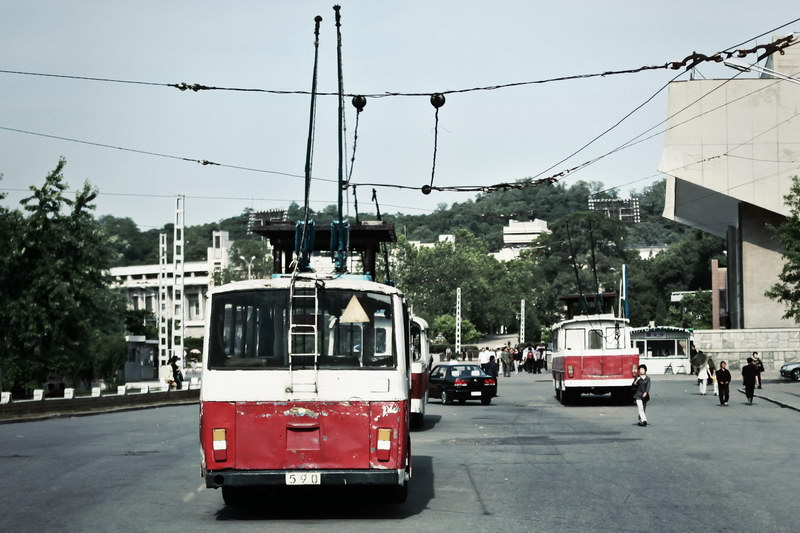
A Chollima 973 trolleybus, #590 also converted from Karosa C734

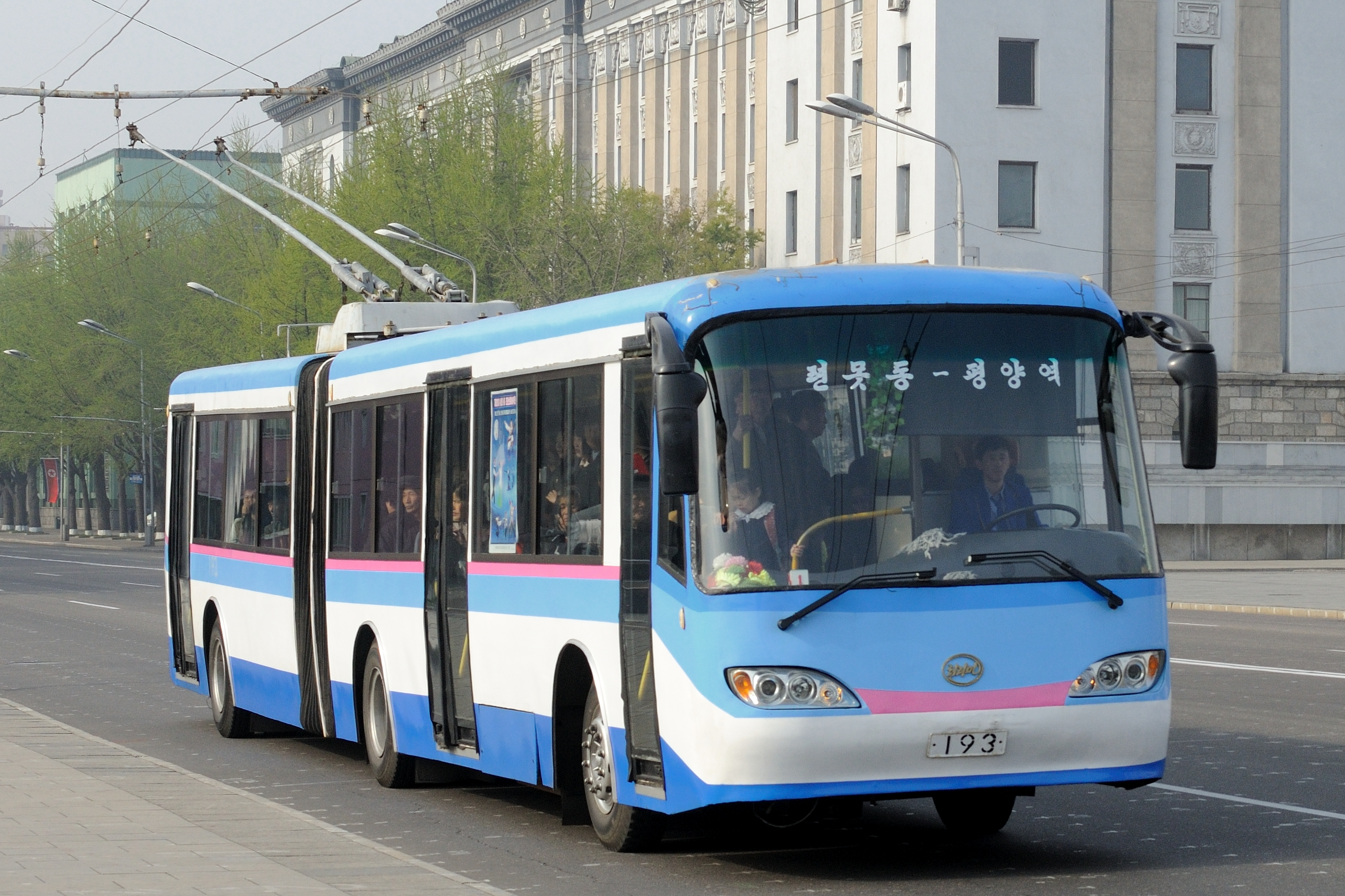
A domestically produced Chollima-091, 2014

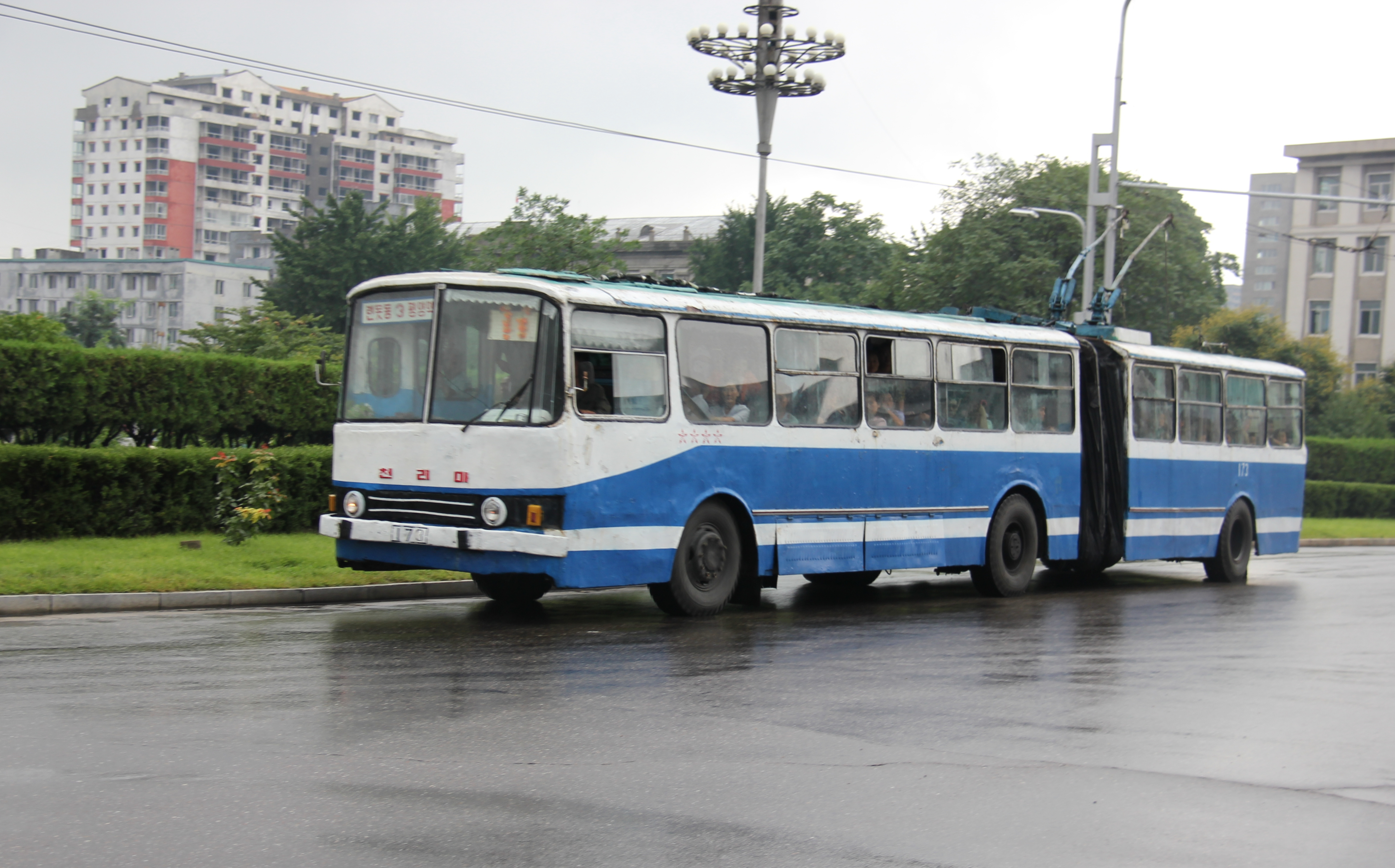
Chollima-862 produced since 1986

=== New rolling stock ===
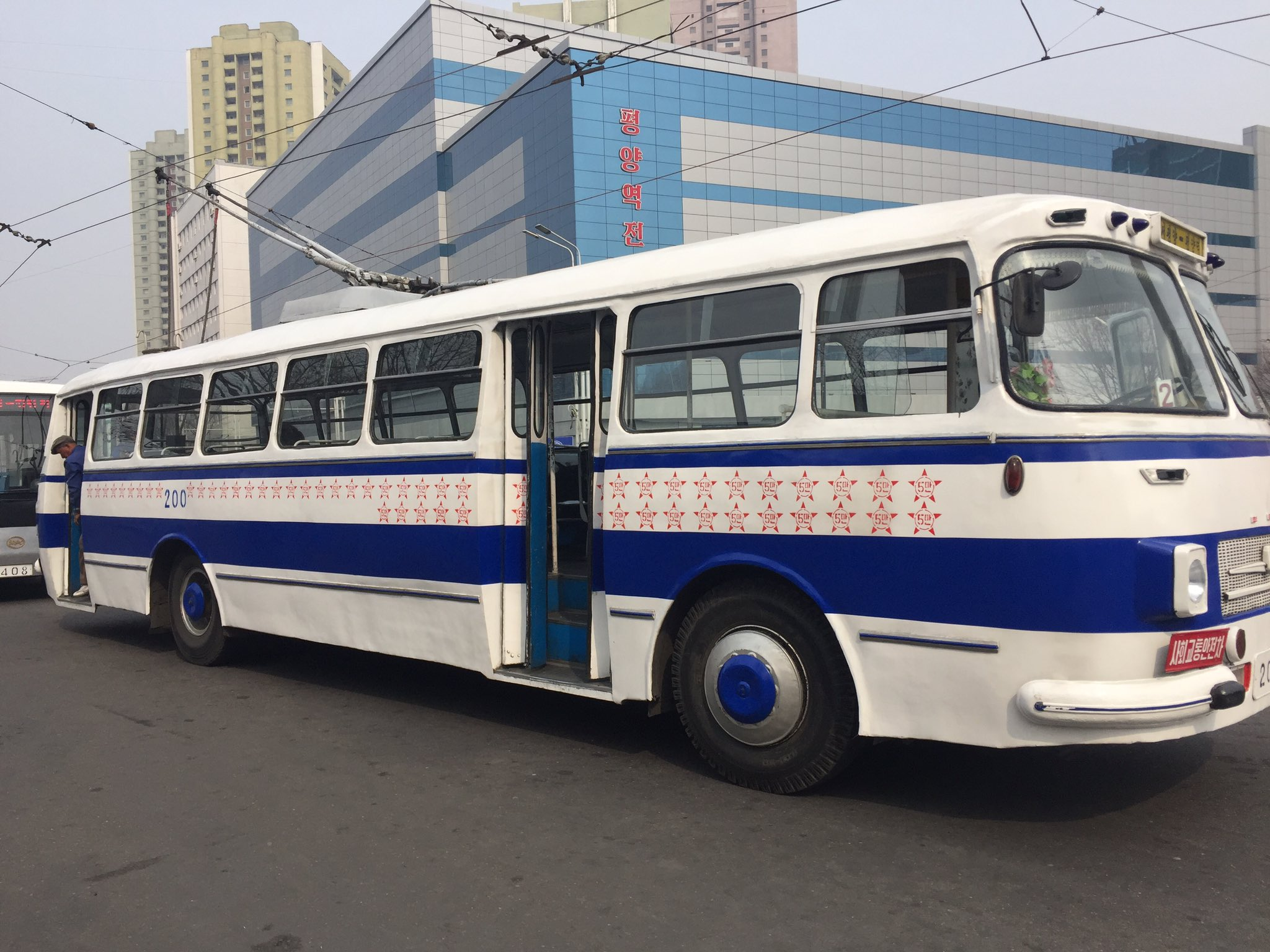
A veteran Chollima 72 trolleybus in Pyongyang. Each red distance star painted on the side represents 50,000 kilometres travelled without incident, so this trolleybus has travelled about 3 million kilometres (1.9 million miles).

New trolleybuses are also produced in other provinces and cities, such as in Chongjin.

Despite the new technology incorporated with the new trolleybuses such as a dual power supply using a battery as a backup and LED displays, they do not have air conditioning.

The new trolleybuses were subject to news coverage in the Rodong Sinmun, receiving multiple front-page headlines subjecting the tests. Kim Jong Un also made visits to the Pyongyang Trolley Bus Factory, with the intention to turn the factory 'into a world-class trolley bus producer'. The first visit in February featured the Chollima-316 trolleybus, while the August visit featured the Chollima-321 trolleybus.

In total, about 200 Chollima-091 were manufactured, about twenty Chollima-316 and at least 40 Chollima-321 were produced.

== See also ==
- List of trolleybus systems
- Pyongyang Metro
- Pyongyang tram system
- Trams and trolleybuses in North Korea
- Transportation in North Korea
