= Samhung station =

Pyongyang Metro station

Samhŭng Station 삼흥역

General information
- Location: Taesong-guyok, Pyongyang; Democratic People's Republic of Korea
- Coordinates: 39°3′46.6″N 125°46′5.2″E
- Platforms: 1
- Tracks: 2

History
- Opened: 9 September 1975

Services
Preceding station	Pyongyang Metro	Following station
Chonsung towards Kwangbok	Hyoksin Line	Ragwon Terminus
Location

Samhŭng Station (Korean: 삼흥역; Hanja: 三興驛) is a station on Hyŏksin Line of the Pyongyang Metro.

== Nearby Attractions ==
The station is located in front of the Pyongyang University of Foreign Studies and across the street from Kim Il Sung University.
