= Kwangmyong station (Pyongyang) =

Defunct station on the Pyongyang Metro

Kwangmyŏng Station 광명역

General information
- Location: Potonggang-guyok, Pyongyang; Democratic People's Republic of Korea
- Coordinates: 39°4′6.5″N 125°47′21.9″E
- Line: Hyŏksin Line
- Platforms: 2
- Tracks: 2

Construction
- Parking: Y

History
- Opened: 1978
- Closed: 1995
Location

Kwangmyŏng Station (Korean: 광명역) is a closed station on Hyŏksin Line of the Pyongyang Metro. Due to the death of Kim Il Sung and The Kumsusan Palace being located at Kwangmyong Station, the station is reported to be closed since 1995. Trains pass through this station without stopping.

The station has a parking area for buses or cars in front of the station entrance.

== Nearby attractions ==
- Kumsusan Palace of the Sun
