= Potonggang-guyok =

Coordinates: 39°01′48″N 125°43′12″E

- Guyŏk of Pyongyang

Korean transcription(s)
  - Hangul: 보통강구역
  - Hanja: 普通江區域
  - Revised Romanization: Botonggang-guyeok
  - McCune–Reischauer: Pot'onggang-guyŏk
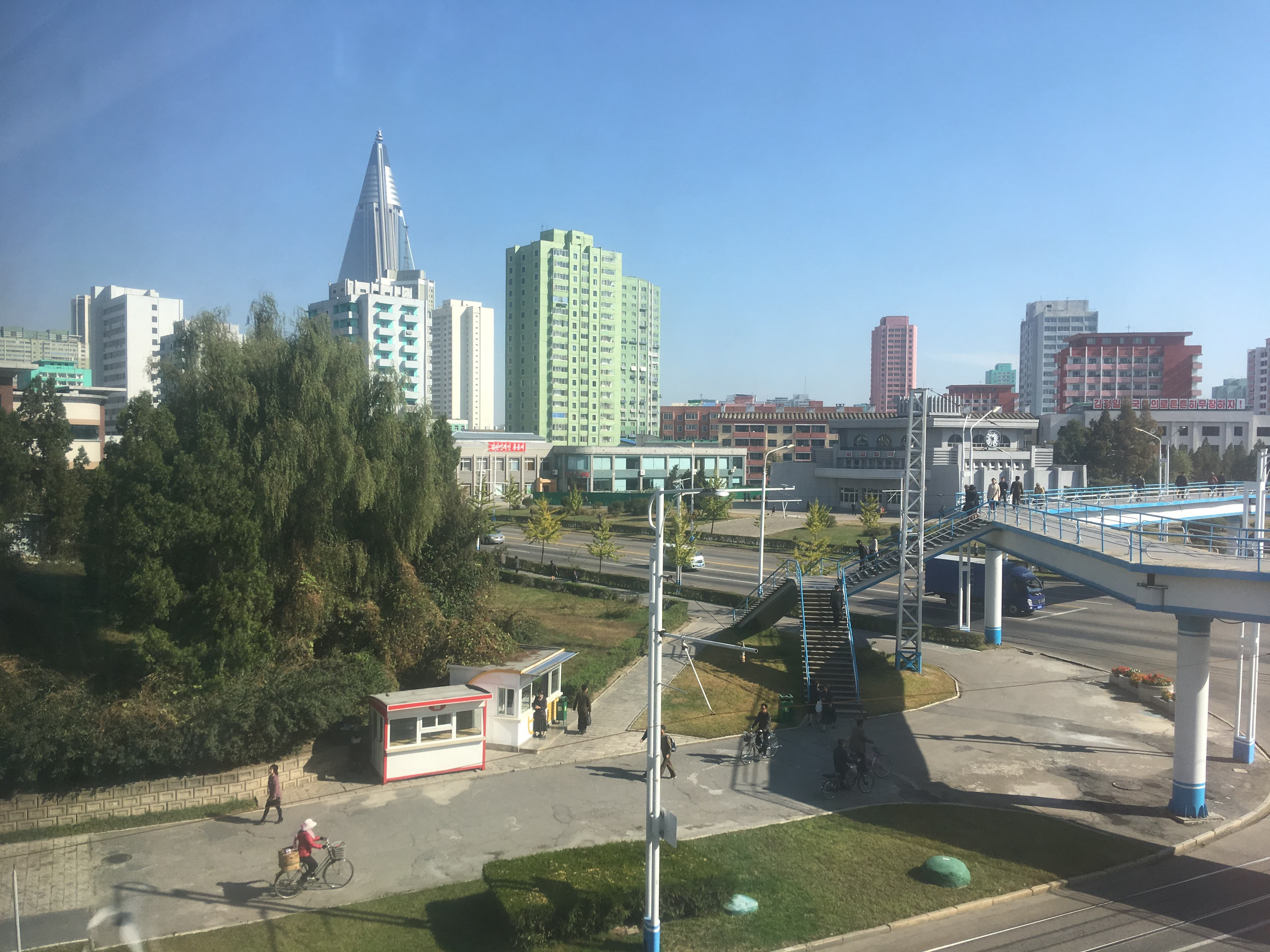

- Location of Potonggang-guyok within Pyongyang
- Country: North Korea
- Direct-administered city: P'yŏngyang-Chikhalsi
- Administrative divisions: 15 administrative dong

Area
  - Total: 7.3 km^{2} (2.8 sq mi)

Population (2008)
  - Total: 105,180
  - Density: 14,000/km^{2} (37,000/sq mi)

Potonggang-guyok is one of the 19 districts, or guyok, and an artificial island of Pyongyang, North Korea. It is best known as the location of the Ryugyong Hotel. It takes its name from the Pothong River (literally "the simple river"), which forms the district's boundary. Potonggang is bordered to the north by Hyongjesan-guyok, to the east by Sosong and Moranbong, to the south by Pyongchon and Chung, and to the west by Mangyongdae-guyok. The district was established by the Pyongyang City People's Committee in October 1960.

== Overview ==
The Pot'ong District is bounded by the Pothong River and the Pothonggang Canal. Primarily a working district, most sites of interest to visitors lie on the district's periphery. The attractions open to visitors include the Potong River Pleasure Ground, the Victorious Liberation of the Fatherland Statue, and the Potong River Improvement Project Monument. The district is also home to the Pyongyang Embroidery School and Factory and the Pyongyang Senior Middle School. Ragwon-dong houses the central offices and headquarters of the DPRK's National Defense Commission.

The Pyongyang Metro runs through the district, with stations at Konsol, Hwanggumbol, and Konguk.

== Administrative divisions ==
Potonggang-guyok is divided into fifteen administrative districts known as dong (neighborhoods):

	Chosŏn'gŭl	Hancha
Kyŏnghŭng-dong	경흥동	慶興洞
Ponghwa-dong	봉화동	烽火洞
Pot'onggang 1-dong	보통강1동	普通江1洞
Pot'onggang 2-dong	보통강2동	普通江2洞
Pulgŭnkori 1-dong	붉은거리1동	붉은거리1洞
Pulgŭnkori 2-dong	붉은거리2동	붉은거리2洞
Pulgŭnkori 3-dong	붉은거리3동	붉은거리3洞
Rakwŏn-dong	락원동	樂園洞
Ryugyŏng 1-dong	류경1동	柳京1洞
Ryugyŏng 2-dong	류경2동	柳京2洞
Segŏri-dong	세거리동	세거리洞
Sŏjang-dong	서장동	西將洞
Sŏk'am-dong	석암동	石岩洞
Sinwŏn-dong	신원동	新院洞
Taebo-dong	대보동	大寶洞
