= Ragwon station (Hyoksin Line) =

Pyongyang Metro station

Ragwŏn Station 락원역

General information
- Location: Taesong-guyok, Pyongyang; Democratic People's Republic of Korea
- Coordinates: 39°4′17.7″N 125°48′59.3″E
- Platforms: 1
- Tracks: 2

Construction
- Structure type: Station Building
- Accessible: N

History
- Opened: 9 September 1975

Services
Preceding station	Pyongyang Metro	Following station
Samhung towards Kwangbok	Hyoksin Line	Terminus
Location

Ragwŏn Station (Korean: 락원역; Hanja: 樂園驛) is the eastern terminus station on Hyŏksin Line of the Pyongyang Metro.

The station features mosaic mural Masters of the Country.

== Nearby attractions ==
- Korea Central Zoo
- Mount Taesongsan
- Central Botanical Gardens
- Pyongyang Memorial Park
- Revolutionary Martyrs' Cemetery
