= Kwangbok station =

Pyongyang Metro station

Kwangbok Station 광복역
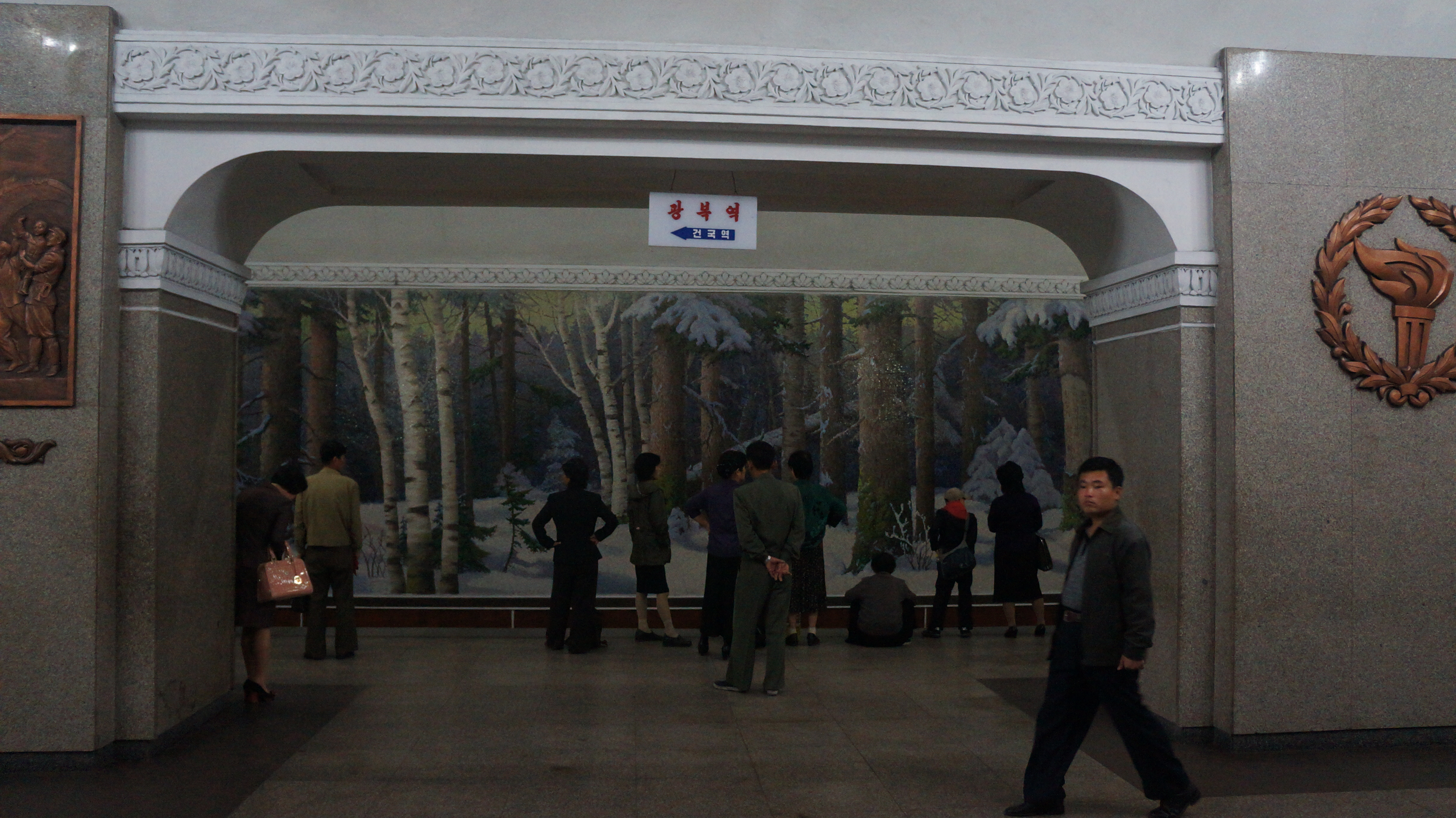

General information
- Location: Mangyongdae-guyok, Pyongyang; Democratic People's Republic of Korea
- Coordinates: 39°2′1.7″N 125°41′32.8″E
- Platforms: 1
- Tracks: 2

History
- Opened: 9 September 1978

Services
Preceding station	Pyongyang Metro	Following station
Terminus	Hyoksin Line	Konguk towards Ragwon
Location

Kwangbok Station (Korean: 광복역; Hanja: 光復驛) is the western terminus station on Hyŏksin Line of the Pyongyang Metro.

The station features a golden statue of Kim Il Sung as well as murals depicting slogan trees – trees engraved with revolutionary slogans from the time of the anti-Japanese struggle. One of these, an embossed mural 70 times four meters in size, is called Lake Samji in Spring.
