= Sungni station =

Pyongyang Metro station

Sŭngni station 승리역
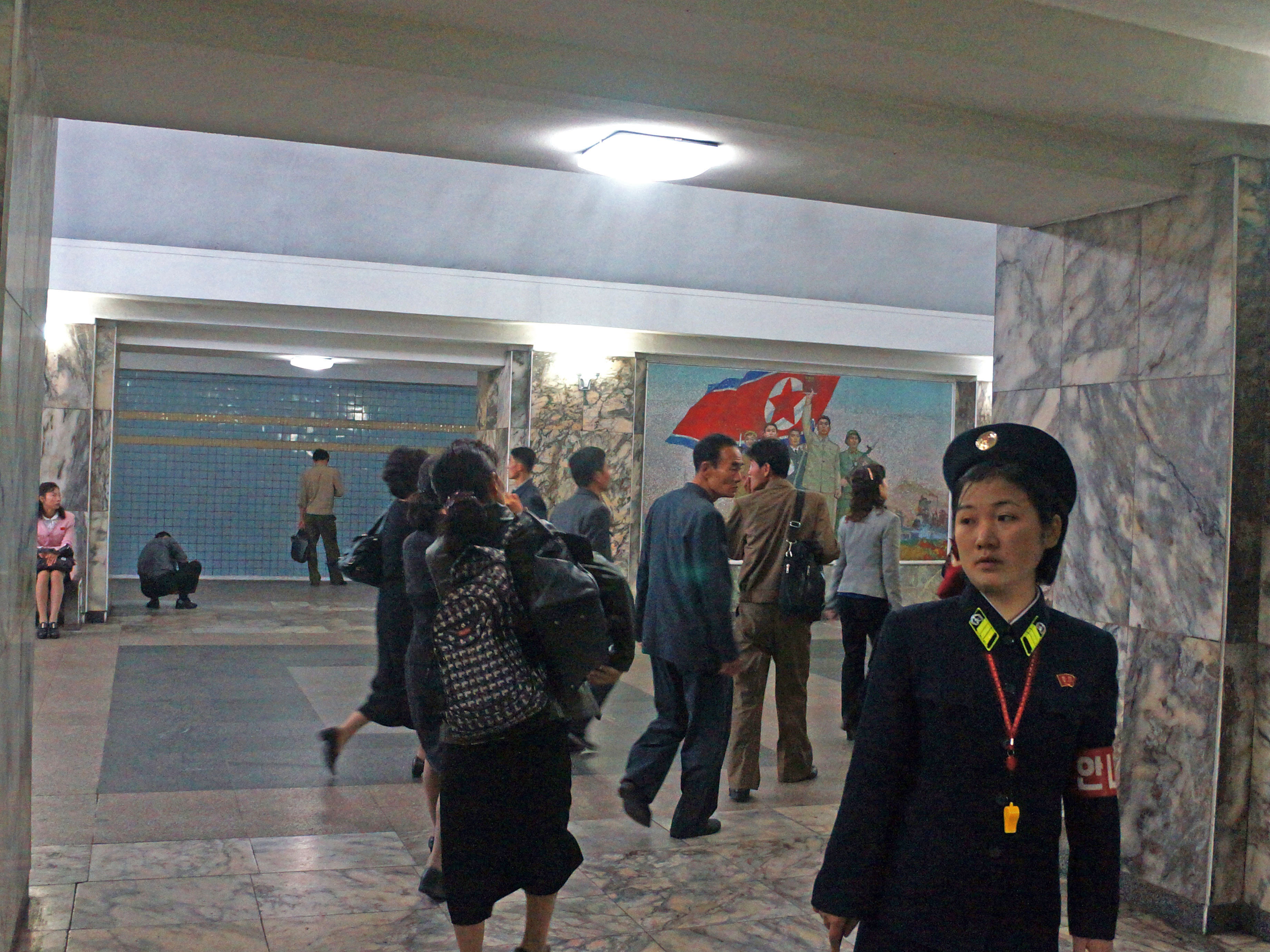

Korean name
- Hangul: 승리역
- Hanja: 勝利驛
- Revised Romanization: Seungni-yeok
- McCune–Reischauer: Sŭngni-yŏk

General information
- Location: Chung-guyok, Pyongyang; North Korea
- Coordinates: 39°1′33.2″N 125°45′18.3″E
- Platforms: 1
- Tracks: 2

Services
Preceding station	Pyongyang Metro	Following station
Ponghwa towards Puhung	Chollima Line	Moranbong towards Pulgunbyol
Location

Sŭngni station is a station on Chŏllima Line of the Pyongyang Metro.
