= 봉화역 =

봉화역 may refer to stations:

- Bonghwa station (奉化驛), railway station on the Yeongdong Line
- Ponghwa station (烽火驛), metro station on the Chollima Line of the Pyongyang Metro
