= Moranbong station =

Metro station in Pyongyang, North Korea

Moranbong Station 모란봉역
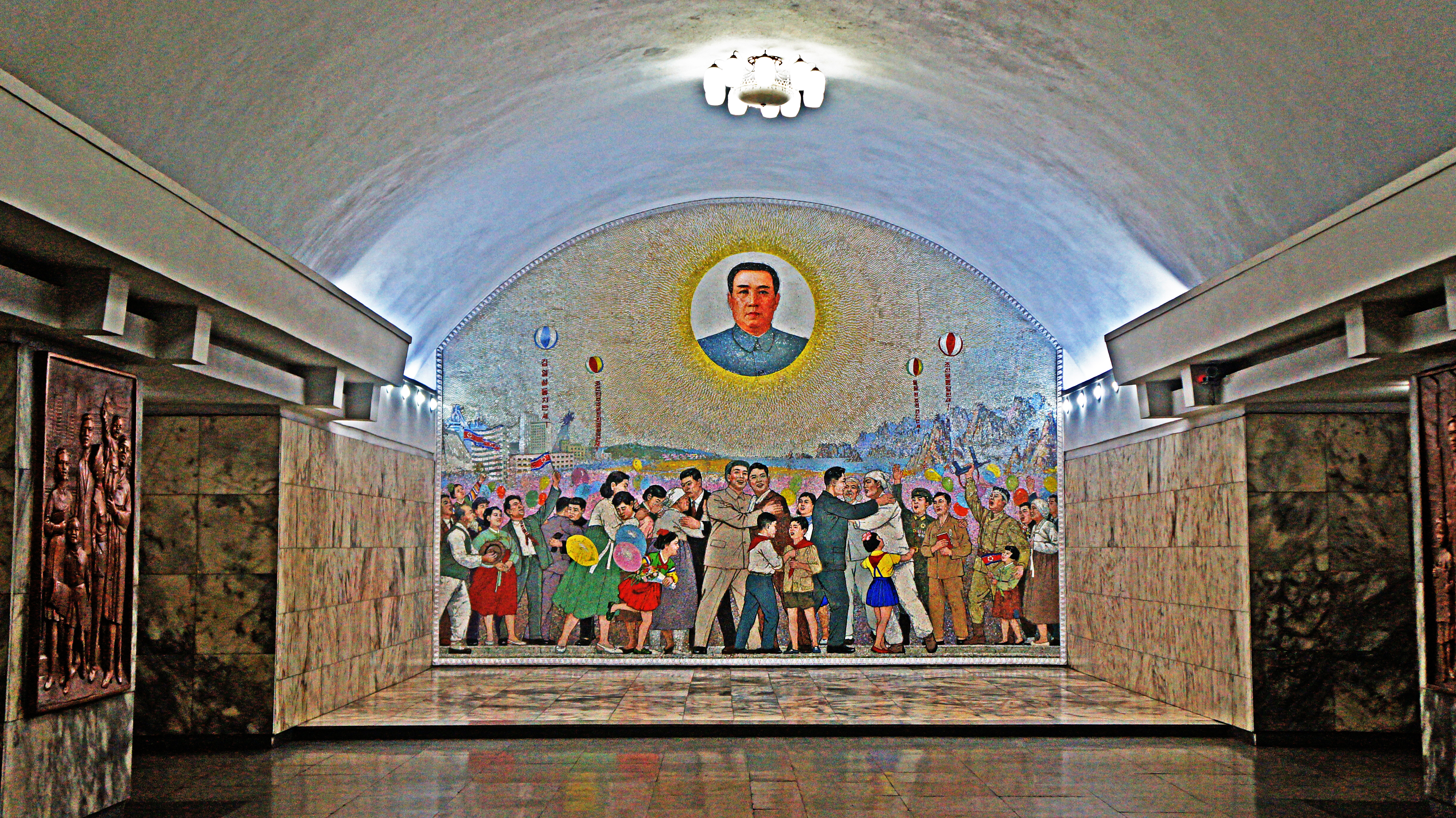

General information
- Location: Chung-guyok, Pyongyang; Democratic People's Republic of Korea
- Coordinates: 39°1′55″N 125°45′23″E
- Operator: Pyongyang Metro
- Platforms: 2 (1 island platform)
- Tracks: 2

Construction
- Structure type: Underground
- Accessible: No

History
- Former names: Tongil

Services
Preceding station	Pyongyang Metro	Following station
Sungni towards Puhung	Chollima Line	Kaeson towards Pulgunbyol
Location

Moranbong Station is a metro station on the Chollima Line of the Pyongyang Metro. The station features TVs, LED displays, and electronic guide maps on its platforms and escalators.

The station was called Tongil Station (통일역; lit. 'Unification Station') until 2024 and featured embossed copper carvings depicting themes of national reunification. In February 2024, "Tongil" was removed from the station name due to Kim Jong Un's decision to officially abandon efforts to peacefully reunify Korea. This temporarily resulted in the name of the station being simply "Station" (역). Around August 2024 the station was renamed after Moranbong Hill (Peony Peak) in Pyongyang.
