= DK4 =

Metro rolling stock built by Changchun

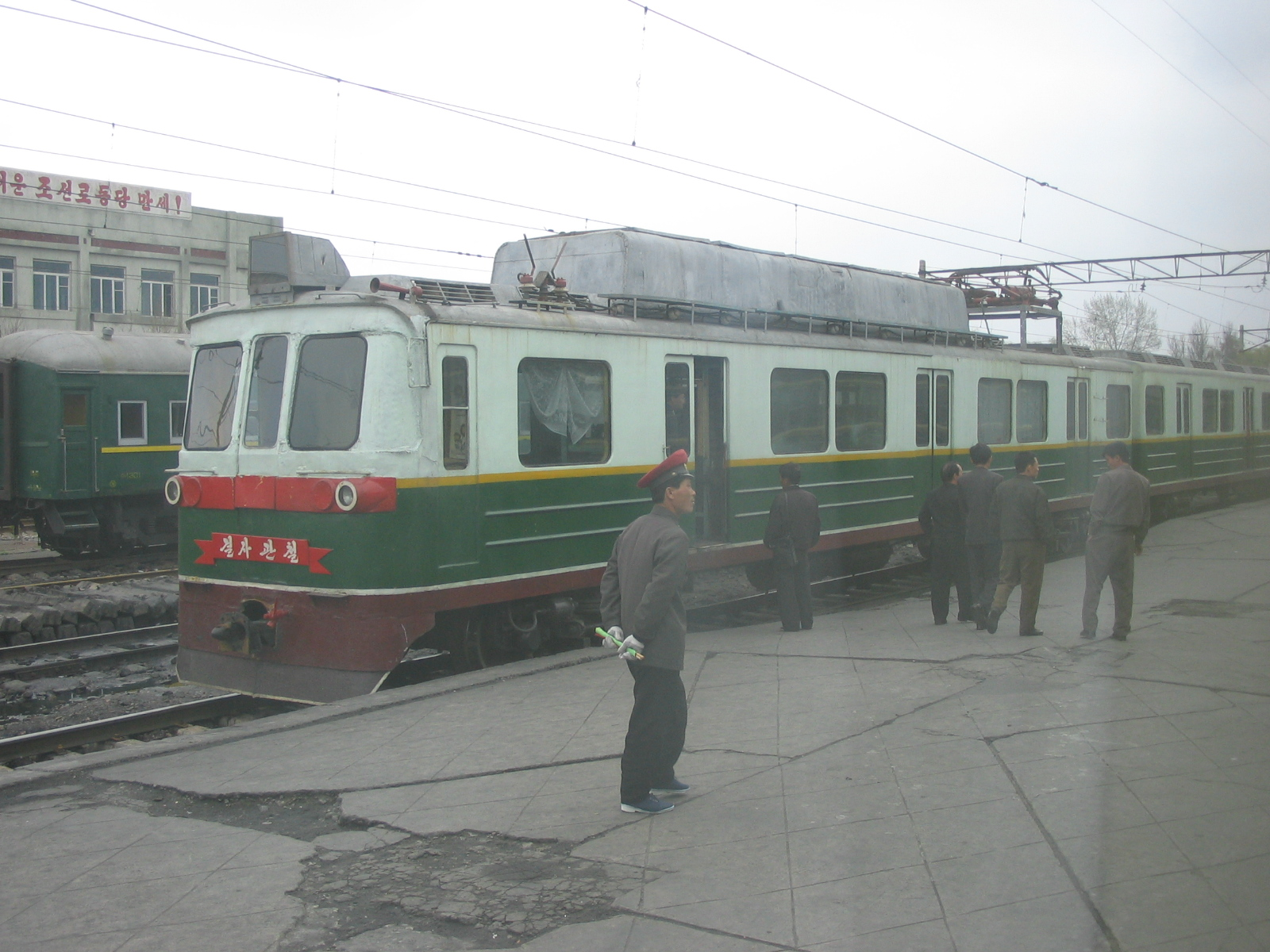
- A DK4 converted to Korean State Railway operation, fitted with a pantograph. The wraparound windows have been replaced with simpler, flat windows and 2 out of 4 headlights have been removed
- In service: 1973–
- Manufacturer: Changchun Railway Vehicles
- Constructed: 1970s
- Number built: 112
- Successor: BVG Class D
- Formation: 1972–1990s Mc+Mc-Mc, Mc+Mc 1990s onwards Mc-Mc+M+Mc
- Fleet numbers: 001-112 (original); 200s (later built non-driving trailers)
- Capacity: 60 seated, 120 standing (not including 20% overload)
- Operators: Pyongyang Metro; Korean State Railway
- Depots: Sopo depot
- Lines served: Chollima Line, Hyoksin Line

Specifications
- Train length: 39,040 mm (128 ft 1 in) (two car)
- Car length: 19,000 mm (62 ft 4 in)
- Width: 2,650 mm (8 ft 8 in)
- Height: 3,587 mm (11 ft 9.2 in)
- Doors: 3 doors on each side, 1,200 mm (3 ft 11 in) wide
- Wheel diameter: 840 mm (2 ft 9 in)
- Maximum speed: 80 kilometres per hour (50 mph)
- Weight: 34,500 kg (76,100 lb)
- Axle load: 20.5 tons
- Traction system: Variable camshaft resistor
- Traction motors: ZQ76-3
- Tractive effort: 304 kW (one hour); 280 kW (longer periods)
- Acceleration: 0.9 ms^{−2}
- Deceleration: 1 ms^{−2} (service); 1.3 ms^{−2} (emergency)
- Power supply: 110 volts
- HVAC: 220V single-phase AC powered ventilation
- Electric system(s): 750 volts (+20%, -35%)
- Current collection: Third rail, top contact In State Railway service: pantograph
- AAR wheel arrangement: 20–20
- Braking system(s): resistor braking, electro-pneumatic brake, hydraulic brake
- Coupling system: Scharfenburg
- Headlight type: 220V AC lighting
- Track gauge: 1,435 mm (4 ft 8 1/2 in)

The DK4 are a class of electrical multiple units built by Changchun Railway Vehicles, operated on the Pyongyang Metro, and later the Korean State Railway. The sets developed in parallel with the DK3, and these sets were delivered new to the Pyongyang Metro when it opened in September 1973, although they have since almost entirely disappeared from the metro network, with many sets being converted to be used under overhead catenary as electric multiple units, or as a locomotive.

== Design ==
The DK4, in its original livery was fitted with three piece, wraparound front windows and painted in light green over darker green cut by either a yellow or red trim. It was the last resistor control metro car built by Changchun Railway Vehicles, as the DK6 and onwards used transistors for starting and braking. The overall design is related to the earlier DK1, DK2 and DK3 metro sets, which the DK4 built off with incremental improvements.

Originally, the DK4 was not designed with non-driving motor cars; instead, two motor cars formed a unit, which could be then formed into two, four or six car sets, with the ability to control the set from any driver's cabin. The cabin has various gauges, in addition to display lamps of the next signal, with support for automatic block signalling. The controls are in the right side, while the broadcasting system is on the left, and behind the broadcasting system are the electrical switches, while next to the controls are the fire extinguisher and the emergency brake air vent lever. The electrical and traction equipment are located underneath the carriage.

The cars feature steel construction, with steel of 2.0 to 2.5 mm (0.079 to 0.098 in) thick welded together for the frame with channel iron to support it. The frame is separated into the chassis, the side walls, the roof and the front and rear walls. Glass wool and a layer of anti-shock, anti-heat paste fills the space between the exterior and the interior. The use of wood in the construction is deliberately limited, with the wood used being treated against fire.

Unlike the majority of metro cars, the seating is arranged in the direction of travel in a 1+2 arrangement.

To allow operation with other units, the Scharfenburg couplers have an electrical connector 'QGJ2-2' located below the coupler. There are a total of 90 contacts, of which 48 are used. Apart from the centre row of 6 pins, the other pins to the left and right are electrically connected as one pin, which facilitates the coupling to units, regardless of their orientation.

An addition on the DK3 and DK4 were the powered ventilation, due to the conclusion that natural ventilation was insufficient. These units are located on the roof of all of the Changchun built cars, with 12 per car. Each ventilation unit has a large circular air inlet in the middle, and two vents on each side, pushing air out to the sides of the carriage.

The DK4 was a significant step forward for Chinese metro wagon construction, and provided a suitable carriage for the Pyongyang Metro, and the Beijing Subway (through the DK3). Some of the flaws with the DK4, observed after ten years of running with the Pyongyang Metro were that the car body was still somewhat heavy, and should be further lightened, the bogie had a shorter than desired lifespan, better electrical systems; doors, compressors and controllers were more complicated than necessary for maintenance, and the quality of workmanship in assembly should be improved.

=== Locally built carriages ===
In the 1970s, Kim Jong-tae Locomotive Works built a number of metro cars based on the DK4 design. One of the carriages built was named the Yonggwang-ho (Korean: 영광호; Hanja: 榮光号) with carriage number 415. It had minor differences, mostly aesthetic, such as the shape of the front, although it appeared to be built without the powered ventilation of the DK4 cars, but by 1999 the ventilation blocks had been added and was apparently coupled to normal DK4 carriages in passenger service as a four car set.

Kim Jong-tae Locomotive Works also built non-driving trailer cars, numbered 2xx, only seen from the 1990s onwards. These had no driver's cab, and were built without powered ventilation. These carriages had lower quality workmanship, such as rougher welds and different interiors (blue longitudinal seats instead of green perpendicular ones).

== In Pyongyang Metro service ==
Quantity	Type	Car numbers	Notes
112	Driving motor (Mc)	001-112	Different sources state that after 1978, more carriages were delivered, such that in 1987, a total of 345 were delivered, thus they were numbered from 001 to 345.
?	Non-driving motor (M)	200s	Only seen in the 1990s, and were probably built by Kim Jong-tae Locomotive Works.

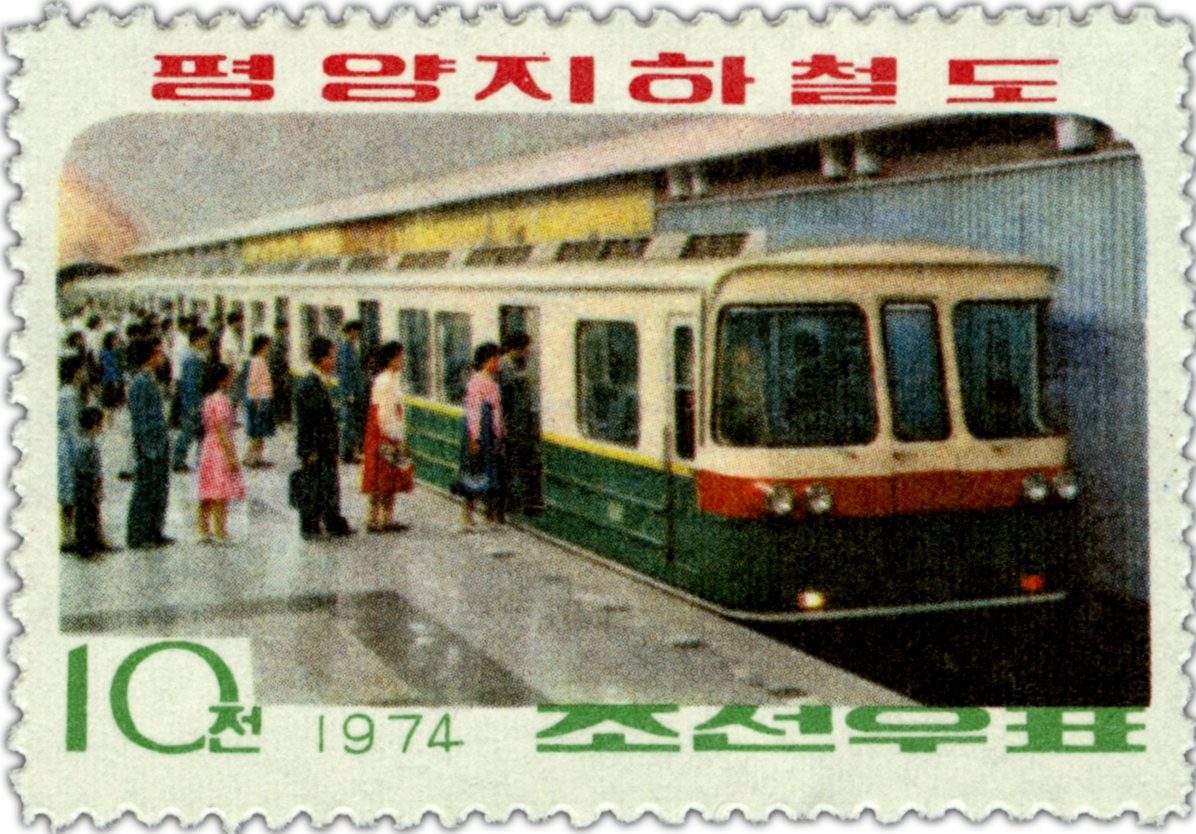
1974 stamp showing a DK4 car at Kaeson station

Initially, in the 1970s and 80s, the DK4 were mainly coupled in two and three-car sets, and later in the 90s, were expanded into four-car sets by either introducing a non-driving motor between two driving motor cars or adding another driving motor car to the set. The cars operated on both lines of the Pyongyang Metro.

By 1998, a number of DK4 cars were believed to have been sold to the Beijing Subway, although it was impossible to prove that the vehicles were actually from Pyongyang. Around that time, the DK4 cars were being supplanted in the metro by BVG Class G and BVG Class D cars, while the ones still in service had their perpendicular seating changed into a long seat, aligned with the window.

Set 001 appears to be a special vehicle, as it has curtains in the driver's cab. While no DK4 cars have been seen in operation since 2007, a set has been seen in the depot, and 001 may be retained as a commemorative vehicle.

== In Korean State Railway service ==
After being removed from metro operation, most sets were modified to run under the 3000V DC overhead line. For this purpose, transformers or voltage-reducing resistors are installed on the roof of the cars and covered with a metal shroud.

In Chagang Province, a two-car DK4 was modified into a railway inspection vehicle, with all but one door on the right side being removed. A diesel generator appears to have been added to supplement the overhead power source.

Another conversion was to take a single motor car, and to make it controllable from both ends. One such DK4 was spotted running near Manpo, acting as a locomotive and pulling a number of freight cars.

=== Named units ===
- Paektu Secret Camp-type (Korean: 백두밀영호; Hanja: 白頭秘营号), name carried by a few units.
