= Ponghwa station =

Pyongyang Metro station

Ponghwa Station 봉화역
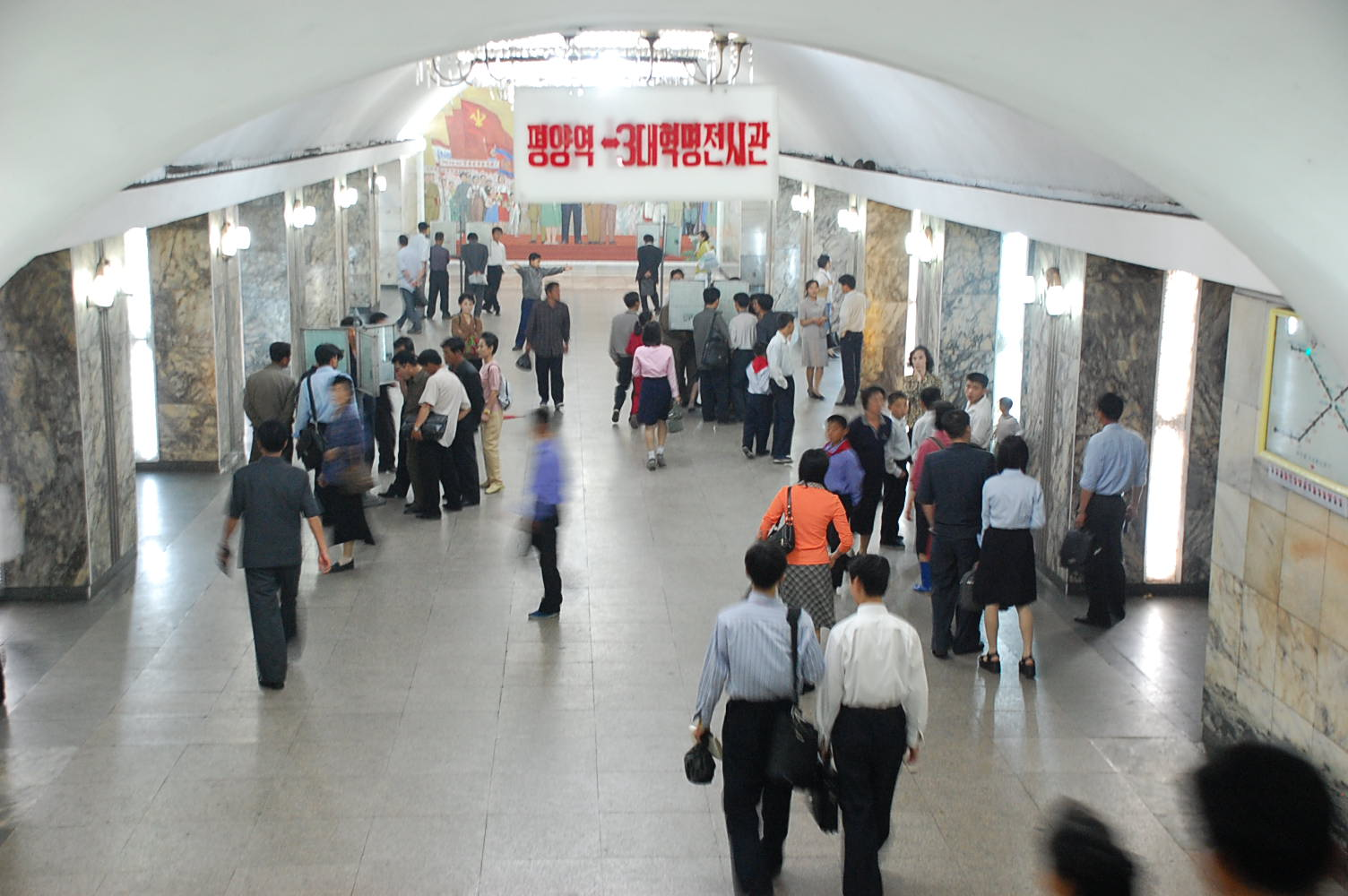
- Old look of Ponghwa

General information
- Location: Haebansang Street near Changgwang Street; Democratic People's Republic of Korea
- Coordinates: 39.012475°N 125.745094°E
- Lines: Chŏllima Line; Man'gyŏngdae Line
- Platforms: 2 (1 island platform)
- Tracks: 2

History
- Opened: 6 September 1973

Services
Preceding station	Pyongyang Metro	Following station
Yonggwang towards Puhung	Chollima Line	Sungni towards Pulgunbyol
Location

Ponghwa Station is a station on the Chŏllima Line and the Man'gyŏngdae Line of the Pyongyang Metro. Both lines are operated as a single continuous service, hence all trains from either line runs through to the other line at the station. Some Chŏllima Line trains formerly short turned at the station.

The station consists of a single storey building with a large clock above the station entrance. According to foreign visitor information, the station was retrofitted during the COVID-19 pandemic (i.e., during the early 2020s).

== Nearby ==
- Pyongyang Medical University
