= Kaeson station =

Pyongyang Metro station

Kaesŏn Station 개선역
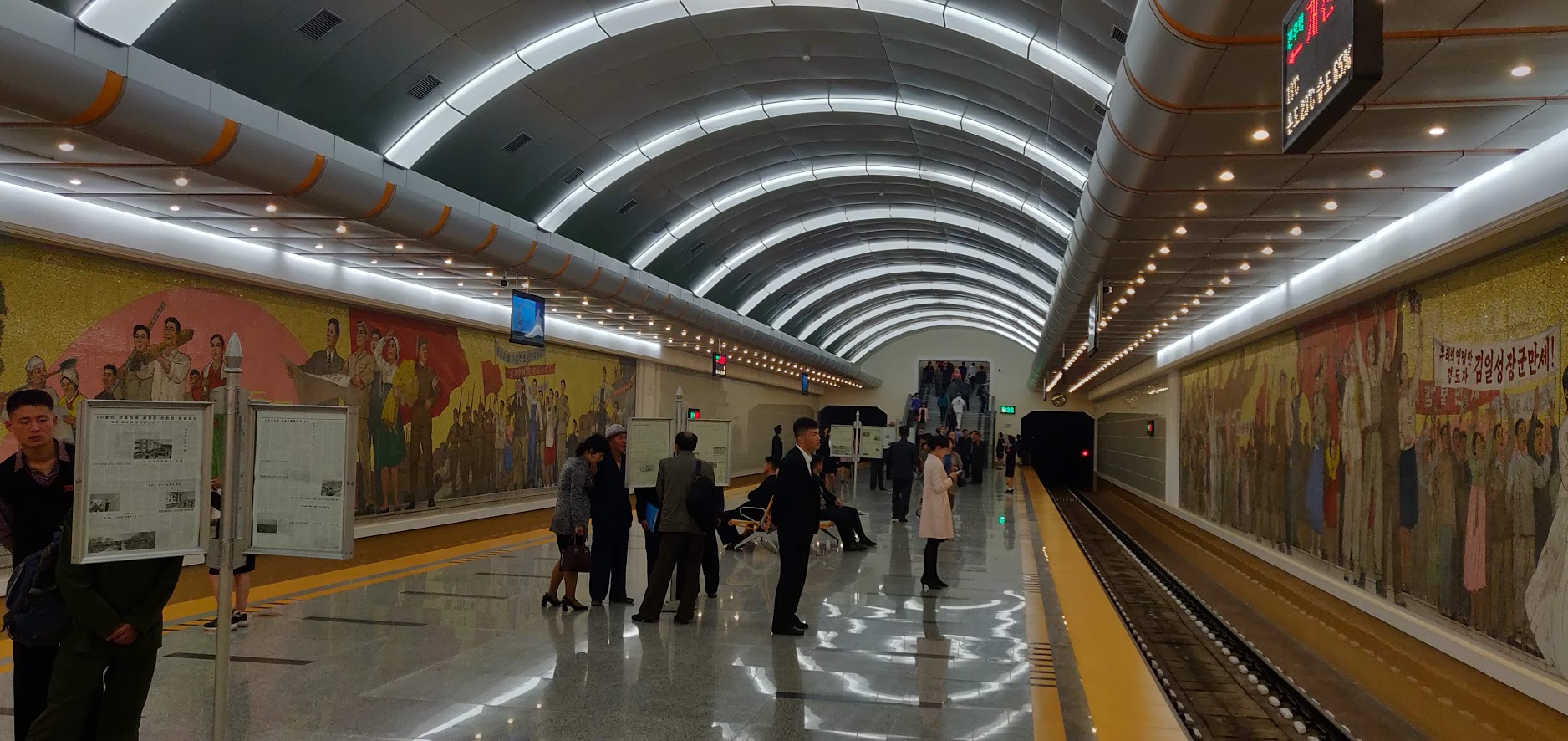
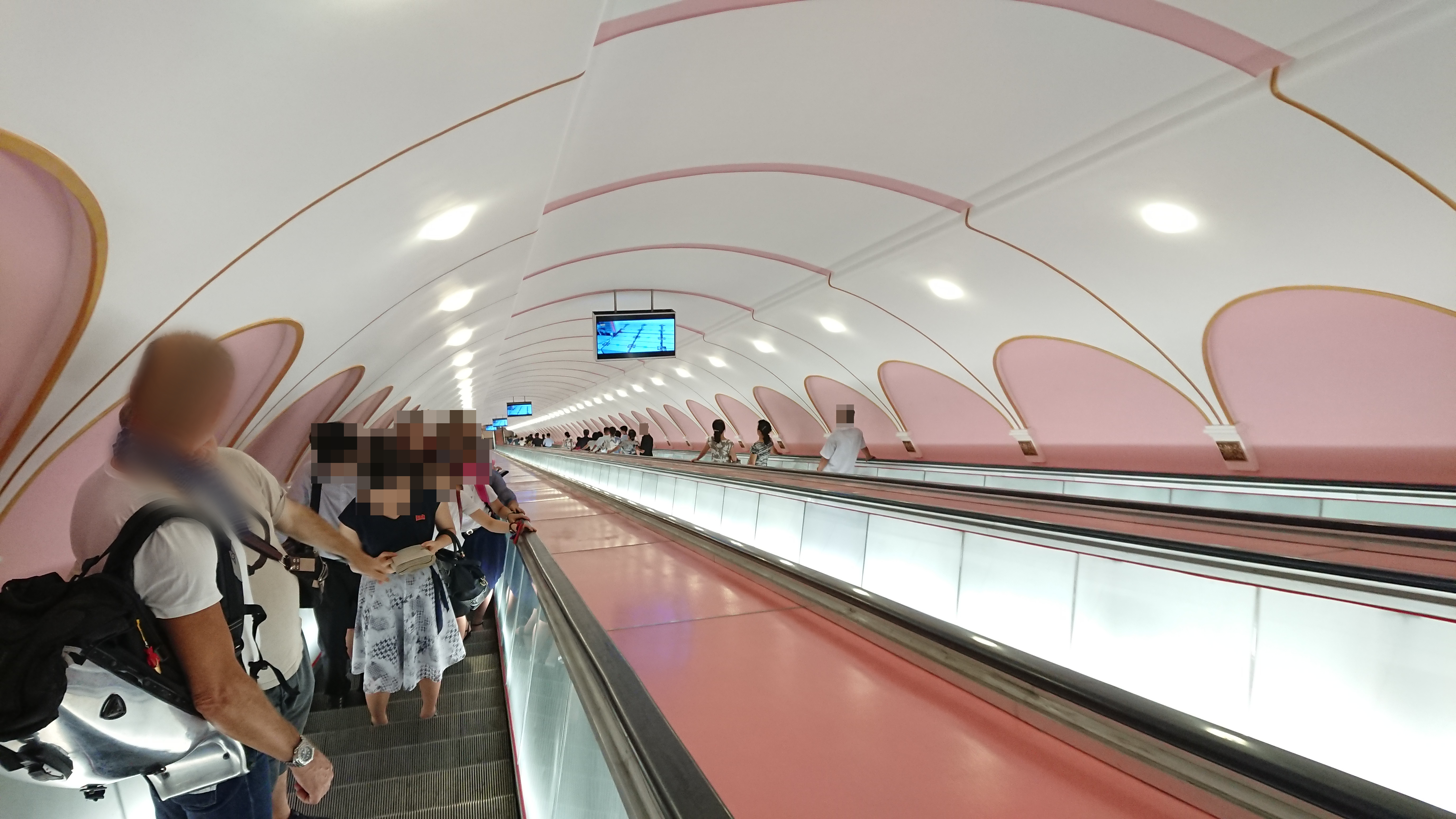

General information
- Location: Moranbong-guyok, Pyongyang; Democratic People's Republic of Korea
- Coordinates: 39°2′35″N 125°45′14.3″E
- Platforms: 1
- Tracks: 2

Services
Preceding station	Pyongyang Metro	Following station
Moranbong towards Puhung	Chollima Line	Jonu towards Pulgunbyol
Location

Kaesŏn Station is a station on Chŏllima Line of the Pyongyang Metro. It is located near the Arch of Triumph and Kaesŏn Youth Park.

The station was refurbished in 2019 with new lighting and TVs to entertain waiting passengers, as well as LED signs showing train information and local weather.

The mural is called The People Rise up in the Building of a New Country.

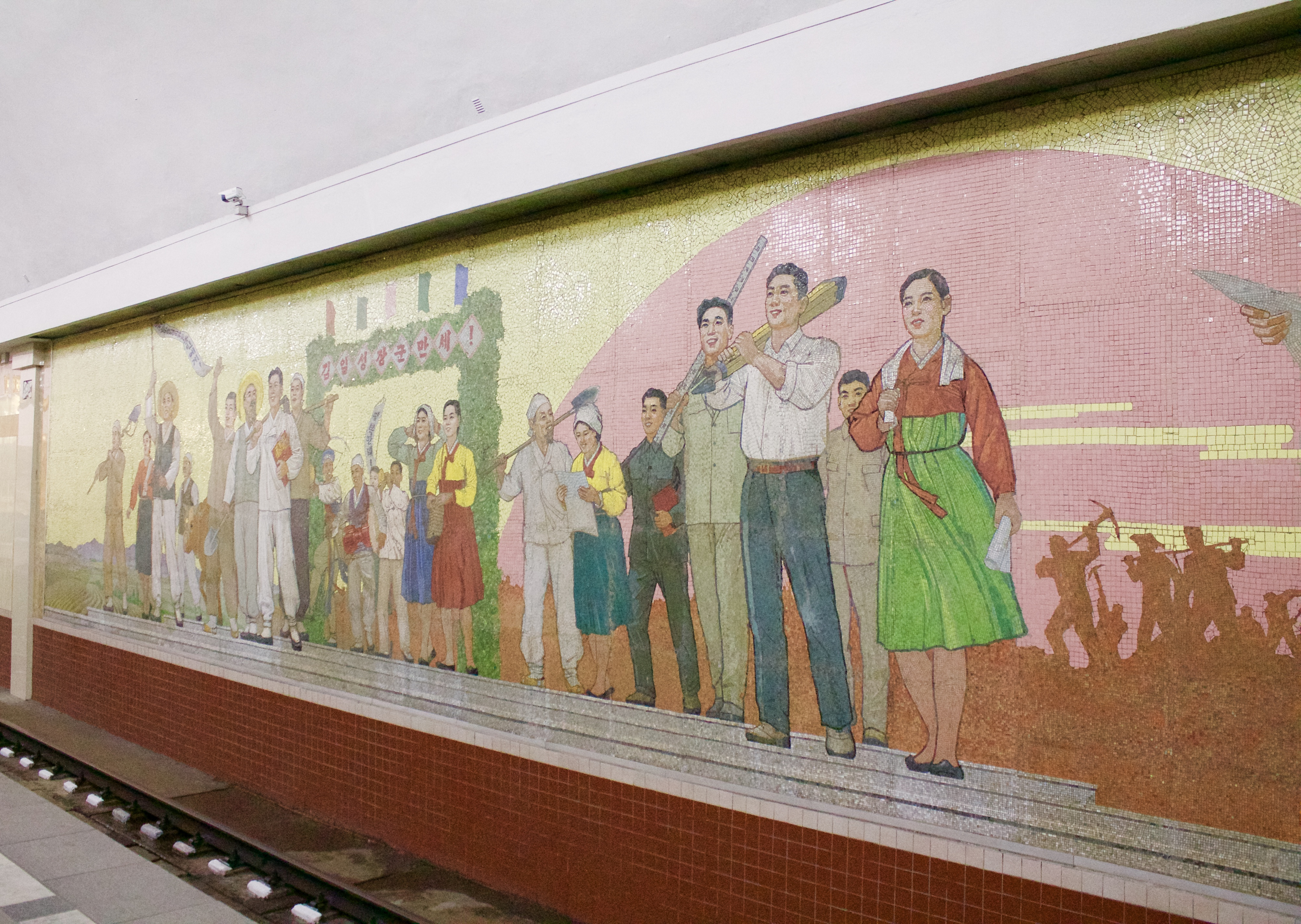
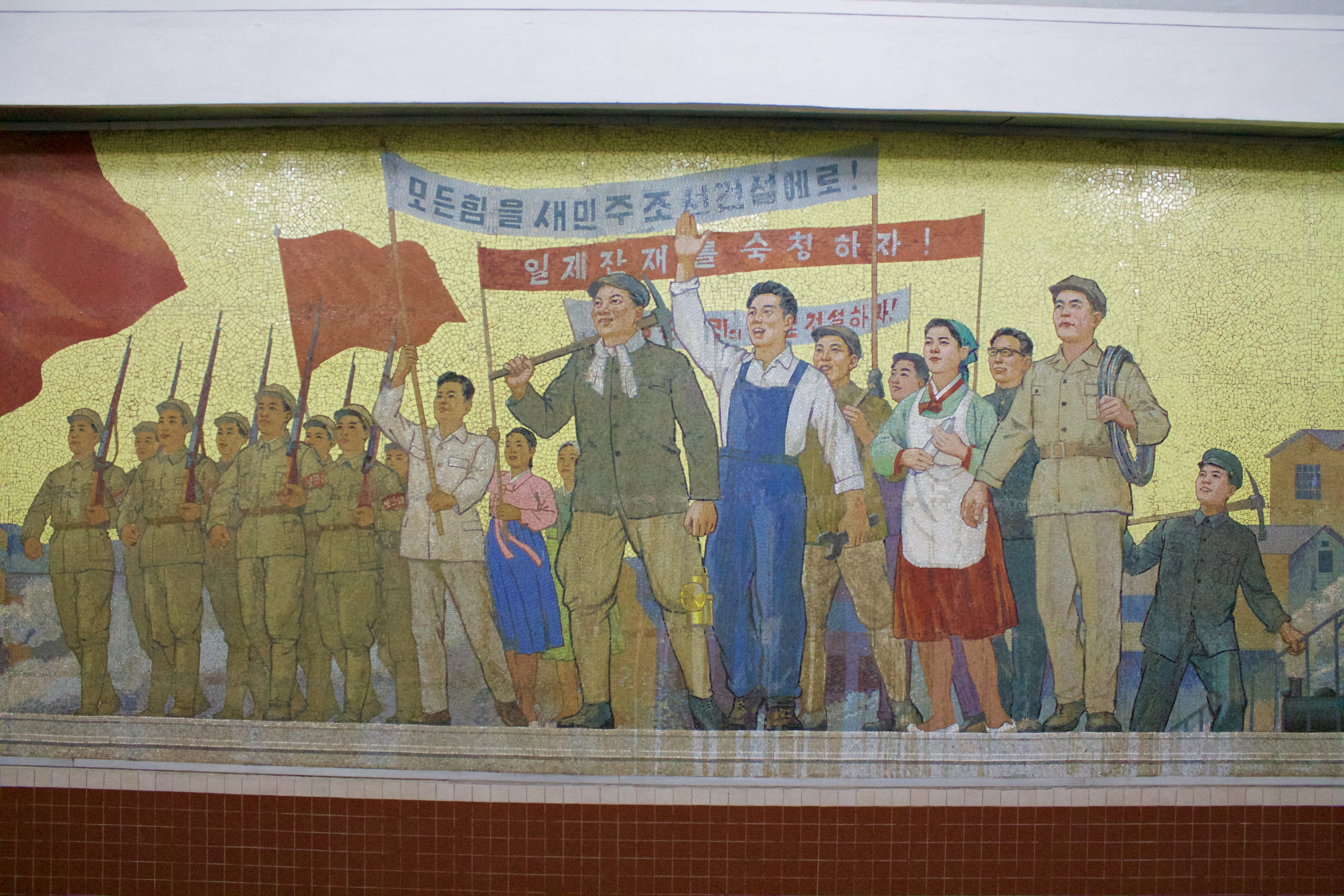
The People Rise up in the Building of a New Country
