= Pyongyang Metro =

Rapid transit system in North Korea

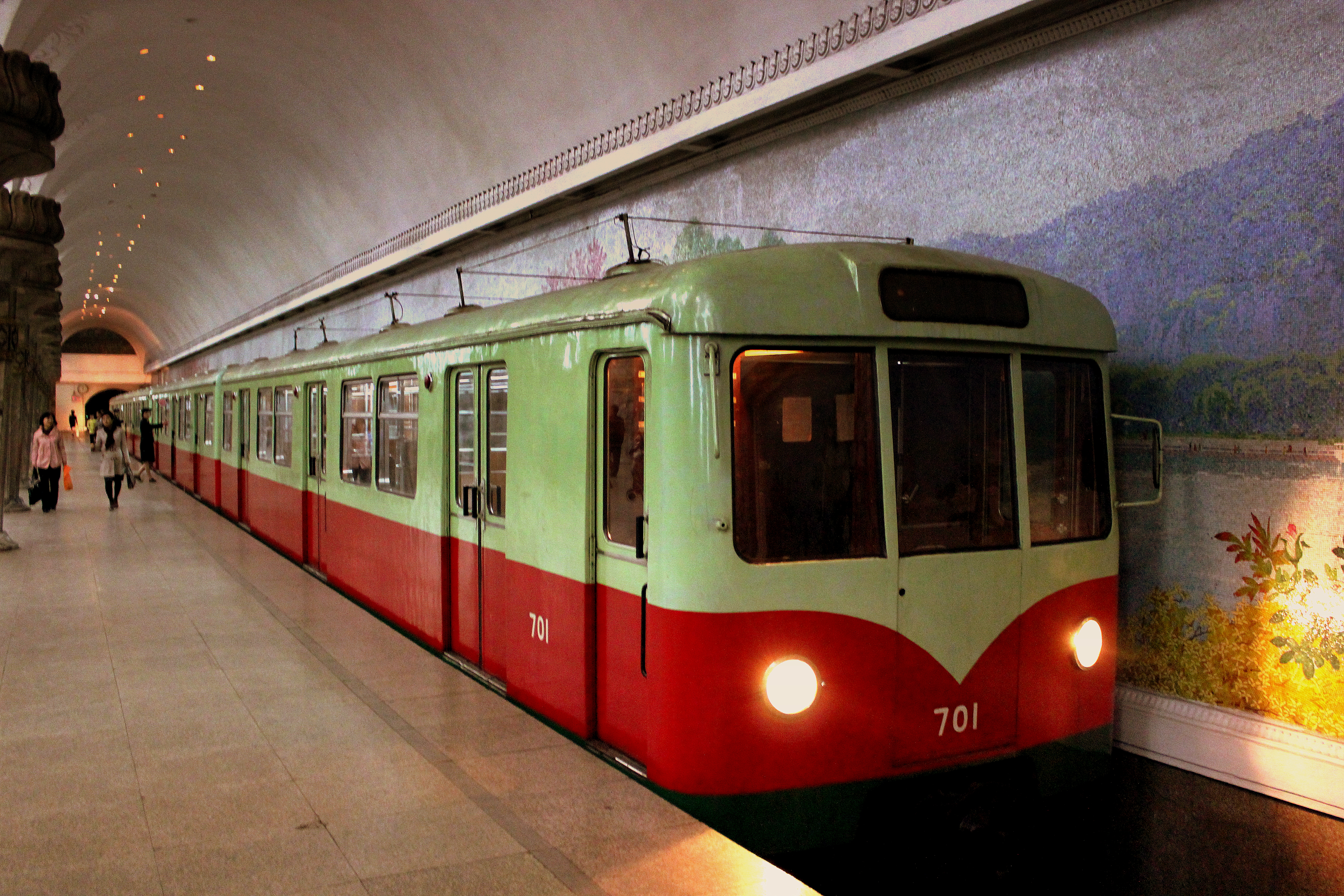
- Type D (Yŏnggwang Station)

Overview
- Native name: 평양 지하철도
- Locale: Pyongyang, North Korea
- Transit type: Rapid transit
- Number of lines: 2
- Line number: Chollima Line; Hyoksin Line
- Number of stations: 16 (Chollima Line : 8, Hyoksin Line : 8)
- Daily ridership: 400,000 (Weekdays); 700,000 (Holidays) (July 2019)
- Headquarters: Pyongyang Metro, City Metro Unit, Railway Section, Transport and Communication Commission, Pyongyang, Democratic People's Republic of Korea

Operation
- Began operation: September 5, 1973; 53 years ago
- Operator: Pyongyang Metro Administration Bureau
- Number of vehicles: 224 (Type D : 216, Type 1 : 8)
- Train length: 4
- Headway: 3 minute (peak); 5 minute (off-peak)

Technical
- System length: 22.5 km (14.0 mi)
- Track gauge: 1,435 mm (4 ft 8 1/2 in) standard gauge
- Top speed: 70 km/h (43 mph) (Type D)
Route Map of Pyongyang Metro
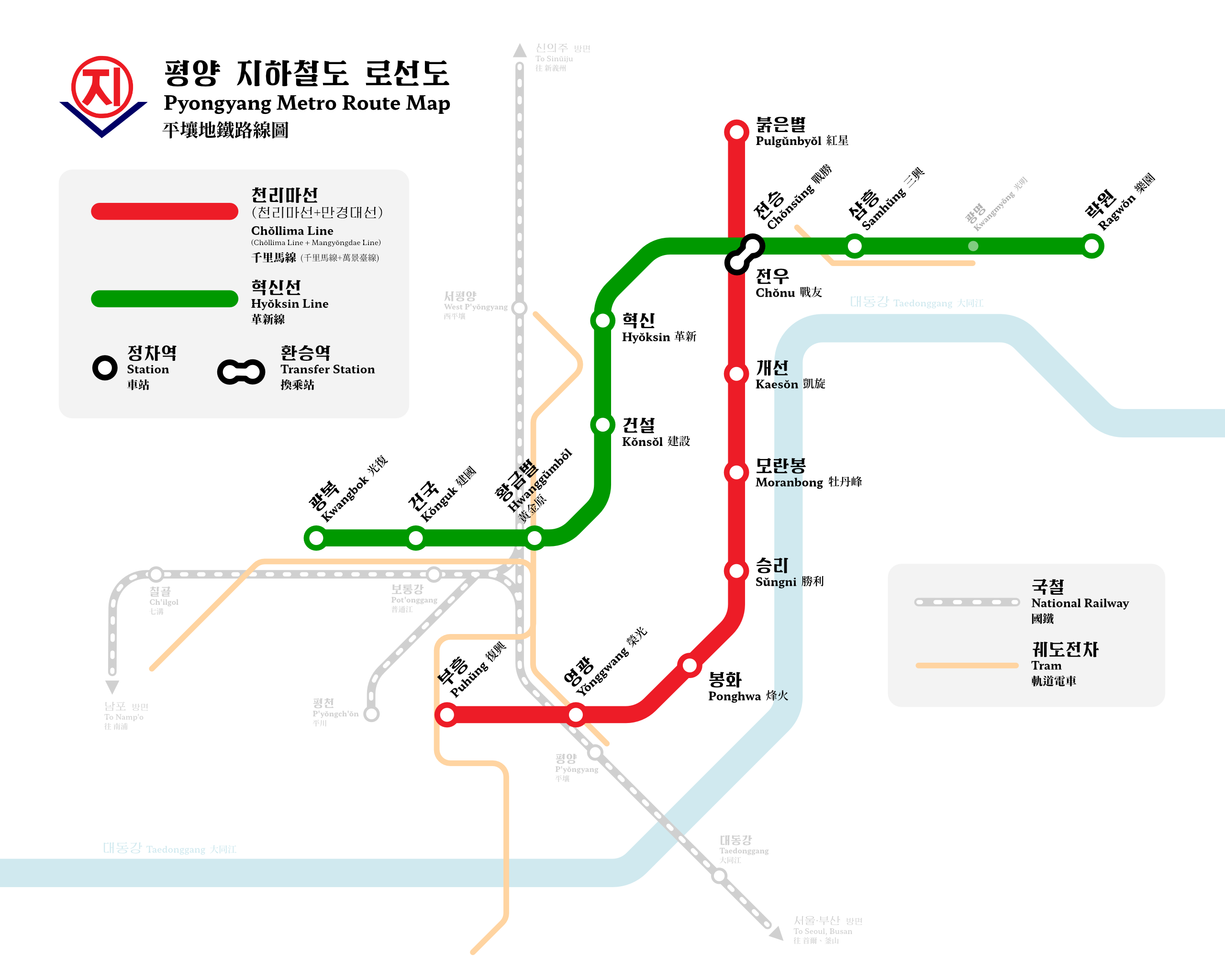

- Pyongyang Metro
- Hangul: 평양 지하철도
- Hanja: 平壤地下鐵道
- RR: Pyeongyang jiha cheoldo
- MR: P'yŏngyang chiha ch'ŏlto

The Pyongyang Metro (Korean: 평양 지하철도) is the rapid transit system in Pyongyang, the capital and largest city of North Korea. It consists of two lines: the Chollima Line, which runs north from Puhŭng Station on the banks of the Taedong River to Pulgŭnbyŏl Station, and the Hyŏksin Line, which runs from Kwangbok Station in the southwest to Ragwŏn Station in the northeast. The two lines intersect at Chŏnu Station.

Daily ridership is estimated to be between 300,000 and 700,000. Structural engineering of the Metro was completed by North Korea, with rolling stock and related electronic equipment imported from China. This was later replaced with used rolling stock acquired from the Berlin U-Bahn.

The Pyongyang Metro has a museum devoted to its construction and history.

== Construction ==
Construction of the metro network started in 1965, and stations were opened between 1969 and 1972 by Supreme Leader Kim Il Sung. Most of the 16 public stations were built in the 1970s, except for the two most grandiose stations—Puhŭng and Yŏnggwang, which were constructed in 1987. According to NK News sources, a construction accident in 1971 killed tens if not hundreds of laborers, forcing the rerouting of the metro to not cross the Taedong River.

China provided technical aid for the metro's construction, sending experts to install equipment made in China, including electrical equipment made in Xiangtan, Hunan and the escalator with vertical height of 64 metres (210 ft) made by Shanghai Seleva.

The Pyongyang Metro is among the deepest metros in the world, with the track at over 110 metres (360 ft) deep underground; the metro does not have any above-ground track segments or stations. Due to the depth of the metro and the lack of outside segments, its stations can double as bomb shelters, with blast doors in place at hallways. It takes three and a half minutes from the ground to the platform by escalator. The metro is so deep that the temperature of the platform maintains a constant 18 °C (64 °F) all year. The Saint Petersburg Metro also claims to be the deepest, based on the average depth of all its stations. The Hongyancun station on Chongqing Rail Transit's Line 9 is currently the deepest station in the world at 116 metres (381 ft). The deepest heavy rail station in the world is the Jerusalem–Yitzhak Navon railway station, located 80 m (260 ft) underground. The Porta Alpina railway station, located above the Gotthard Base Tunnel in Switzerland, was supposed to be 800 m (2,600 ft) underground, but the project was indefinitely shelved in 2012.

The system was initially electrified at 825 volts, but lowered down to 750 volts to support operation of the Class GI sets. However, this conflicted with the documentation on the DK4 sets, which uses 750 volts with a +20% and a -38% tolerance.

A 1999 KBS news broadcast stated that two lines were under construction, with line 3 to run from Kwangbok station to Mangyongdae, while the location of line 4 was unknown. The two lines were to open for the 55th Party Foundation Day.

In 2012, Korean Central Television released renders of a new station bearing the name Mangyongdae displayed at the Pyongyang Architectural Festival.

In 2018, NK News claimed that there would be possible extensions to the metro system, with anonymous sources claiming activity to the west of Kwangbok Station. Commercial satellite imagery revealed only one structure under construction, and it speculated an absence of announcements from state media was due to funding issues, as well as due to the 1970s tunneling accidents.

In 2019, Kaeson station and Moranbong station were modernised, adding TVs that show the next service and brighter lighting. This was followed by Jonu station and Chonsung station in 2020. The TVs can also display a digital version of the Rodong Sinmun.

At the 8th Congress of the Workers' Party of Korea, it was announced to push forward on the updating and renovation of the Pyongyang Metro, along with the production of new-type subway trains.

In 2025, it was announced that remodeling was recently completed at several metro stations, including the Jonu, Moranbong, Pulgunbyol, and Yonggwang stations.

== Operation ==
VOA report showing a ride on the former West German U-Bahn cars in 2013

The Pyongyang Metro was designed to operate every few minutes. During rush hour, the trains can operate at a minimum interval of two minutes. The trains have the ability to play music and other recordings. In current service, they run at every 3 minutes in rush hour and every 5 minutes throughout the day. It operates from 5:30 to 23:30.

The Pyongyang Metro is the cheapest in the world to ride, at only five North Korean won (worth half of a US cent) per ticket. Instead of paper tickets, the Metro previously used an aluminium token, with the emblem of the Metro minted on it and the Korean "지". It has used a paper ticket system, with "지" printed with blue ink on it. Tickets are bought at station booths. Nowadays, the network uses contactless cards that feature the logo of the network and a train set on the front, with the terms and conditions on the other side. Gates display the number of trips remaining on the card, with a trip being a tap on entry and exit. Smoking and eating inside the Metro system is prohibited and is punishable by a large fine.

=== Network ===
The Pyongyang Metro network consists of two lines:

- Chollima Line, named after a winged horse from ancient Korean mythology. It spans about 12 kilometres (7.5 mi). Construction started in 1968, and the line opened on September 6, 1973. The total route contains the Puhung, Yonggwang, Ponghwa, Sŭngni, Moranbong (formerly Tongil until 2024), Kaeson, Jonu, and Pulgunbyol stations.
- Hyŏksin Line, which literally means renewal, spans about 10 kilometres (6.2 mi). Regular service started on October 9, 1975. The route contains the Kwangbok, Konguk, Hwanggumbol, Konsol, Hyoksin, Jonsung, Samhung, and Rakwon stations. The closed Kwangmyong station is located between the Samhung and Rakwon stations.

The two lines have a linking track, located somewhere near Jonsung station.

Most metro stations bear reference to nearby features, with Kaesŏn Station ("Triumph station") being located at the Arch of Triumph, Yonggwang station located near Yonggwang street, Sungni station at Sungni street.

The network runs entirely underground. The design of the network was based on metro networks in other communist countries, in particular the Moscow Metro. Both networks share many characteristics, such as the great depth of the lines (over 100 metres (330 ft)) and the large distances between stations. Another common feature is the socialist realist art on display in the stations - such as murals and statues. Staff of the Metro have a military-style uniform that is specific to these workers. Each Metro station has a free toilet for use by patrons. Stations also play state radio-broadcasts and have a display of the Rodong Sinmun newspaper.

In times of war, the metro stations can serve as bomb shelters. For this purpose the stations are fitted with large steel doors. Some sources claim that large military installations are connected to the stations, and also that there exist secret lines solely for government use.

One station, Kwangmyŏng, has been closed since 1995 due to the mausoleum of Kim Il-sung being located at that station. Trains do not stop at that station.

The map of the Hyŏksin line shows two additional stations after Kwangbok: Yŏngung (영웅) and Ch'ilgol (칠골), both of them reportedly under development. The map of the Chollima Line, on the other hand, shows four additional stations, two at each end of the line—Ryŏnmot (련못), Sŏp'o (서포), Ch'ŏngch'un (청춘) and Man'gyŏngdae (만경대)—also planned or under development. However, the most recent maps omit these stations. The Chollima line is already connected to the State Railway Sopo station on the way to the metro depot, and plans of the metro seem to suggest that the non-commercial segment of this line would be eventually part of the metro system. However, the current tunnel exit does not allow for this, as this segment does not have third rail electrification, and is locomotive hauled by the GKD5B shunters and would require negotiating a switchback.

In addition to the main system for passenger use, there is allegedly an extra system for government use, similar to Moscow's Metro-2. The secret Pyongyang system supposedly connects important government locations. There is also reportedly a massive underground plaza for mobilization, as well as an underground road connecting two metro stations.

== Rolling stock ==
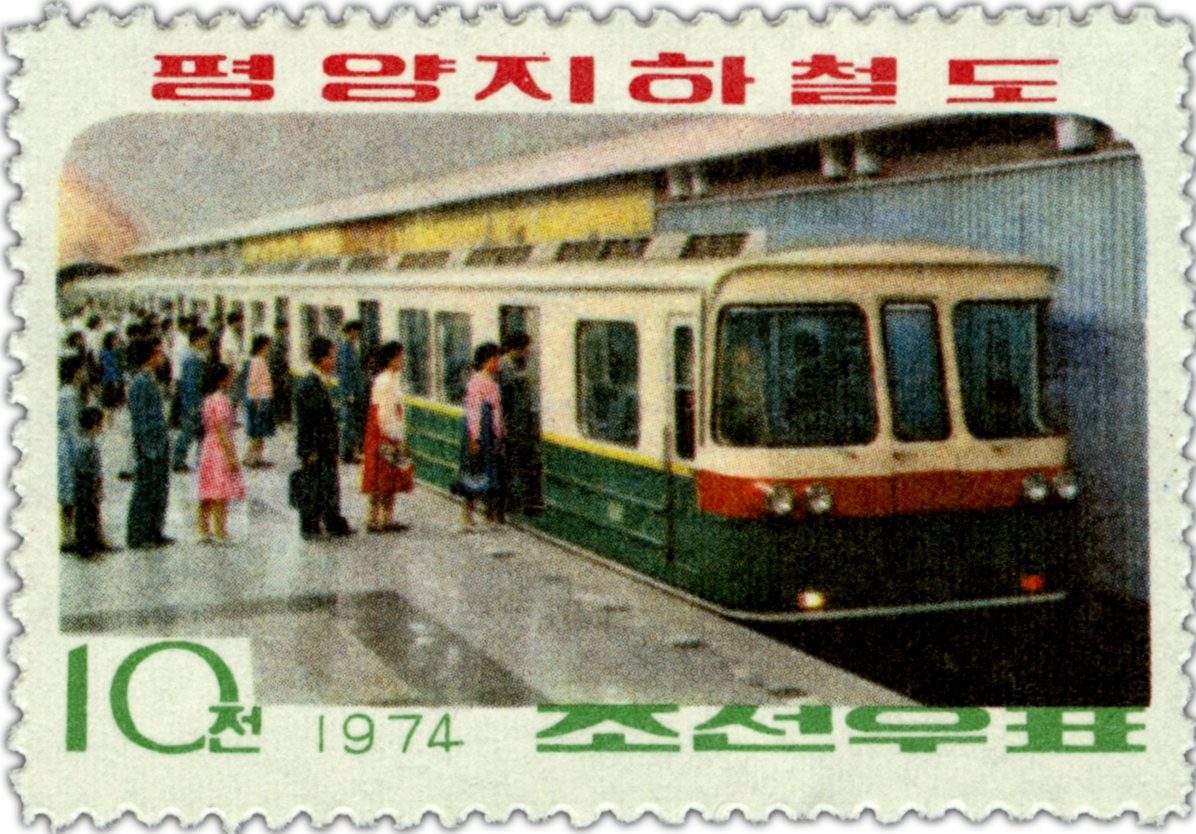
1974 stamp showing a DK4 car at Kaeson

When operations on the Metro started in the 1970s, newly built DK4 passenger cars were used, made for North Korea by the Chinese firm Changchun Railway Vehicles.

Some of the Chinese-made rolling stock have been observed operating near the Sinuiju area and northern regions.

Since 1997, the Pyongyang Metro has mainly used former German rolling stock from the Berlin U-Bahn.

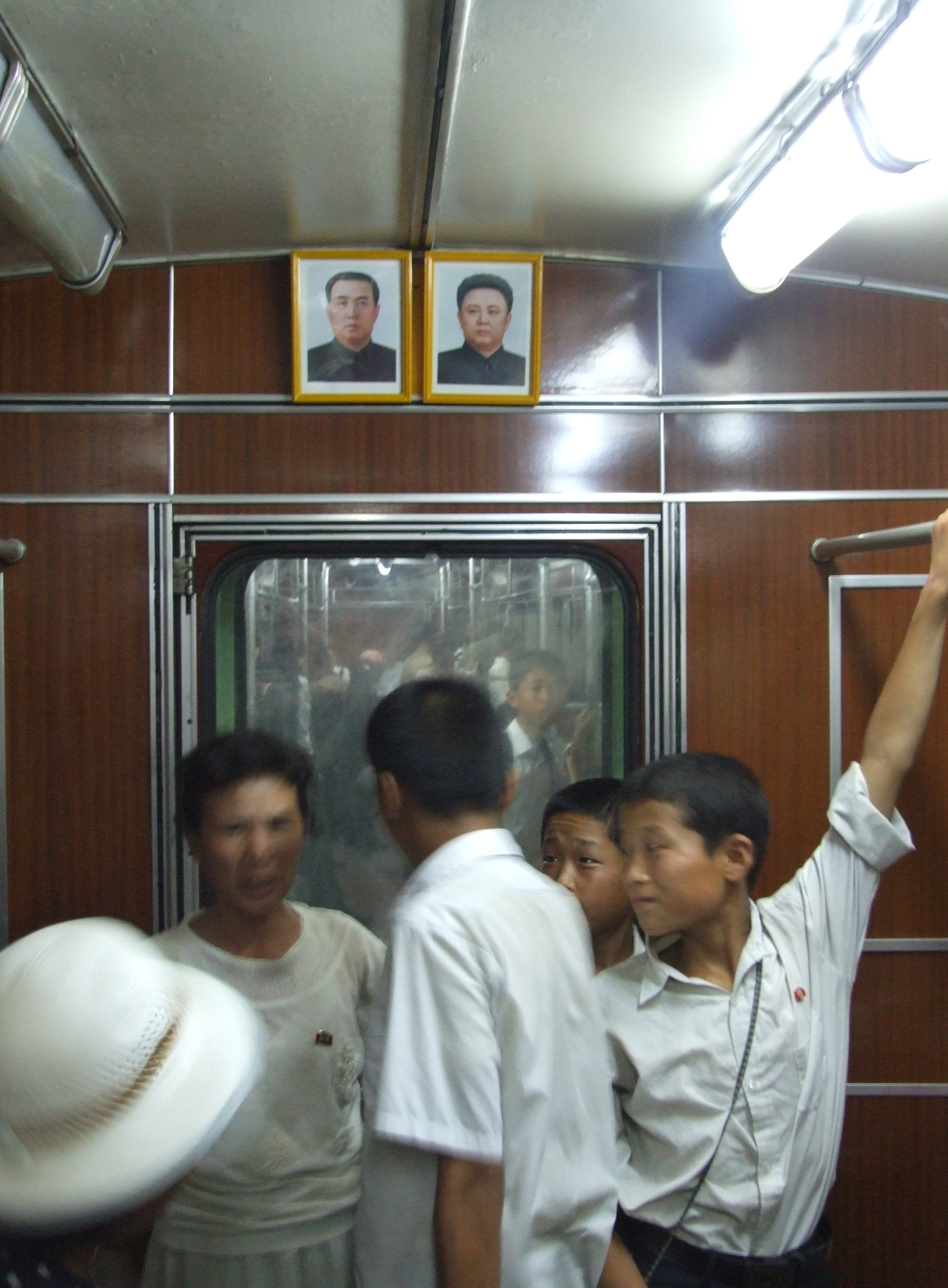
North Koreans riding the Pyongyang Metro in 2012. The portraits above the door are of former leaders Kim Il Sung and Kim Jong Il.

The former Berlin trainsets were given a new red and cream livery in Pyongyang. All advertising was removed and replaced by portraits of leaders, Kim Il Sung and Kim Jong Il. In 2000, a BBC reporter saw "old East German trains complete with their original German graffiti". Koryo Tours in another article write about and show the old West-Berlin D-trains, suggesting that the BBC article could have mixing them up with the Class GI of East Berlin. After about 2006, Type D cars were mainly used. The Class GI rolling stock has been banned from underground tunnel operations due to frequent control stand fires and was withdrawn from Metro service in 2001, and those cars are now operating on the railway network around Pyongyang and northern regions as commuter trains. One Type D metro car appears to have been converted into a departmental vehicle, with a subsequently installed second driver's cab at the car's back next to the inter carriage door. The metro car is painted in yellow with red warning trims.

In 2015, Kim Jong Un rode a newly manufactured four car train set which was reported to have been developed and built at Kim Chong-t'ae Electric Locomotive Works in North Korea, although the cars appeared to be significantly renovated D-class cars. This set is named 'Underground Electric Vehicle No. 1'. It features a VVVF control and initially fitted with an asynchronous motor but later replaced with a permanent magnet synchronous motor developed by the Kim Chaek University of Technology. It usually runs on the Chollima Line but has also run on the Hyoksin Line.

As a gift to the 8th Congress of the Workers' Party of Korea, it is reported that the Kim Chong-t'ae Electric Locomotive Works are working to complete new metro cars, promoted by the 80 day campaign. However, in the Korean Central News Agency article summarising the eighty day campaign, there was no mention of any new vehicles being produced. Previously, it was reported that a 4-door set was to be manufactured to mainly run on the Hyoksin line, to be named Underground Electric Vehicle No. 2. Another news report stated that Kim Chong-tae Locomotive Works was organising the serial production of the Underground Electric Vehicle Type 1 for the 80 day campaign and mentioned the construction of the car body. However, although this was a goal of the 80 day campaign, a new set has yet to be built.

Image	Type	Maximum Speed	Traction	Built	Manufacturer	Country of origin	No. of Cars	Number Range	Disposition	Notes
	DK4	80 km/h	Camshaft variable resistor control, 76 kW max output per motor, total 304 kW. Designed to run on 750 volts.	1973–1978	CNR Changchun Railway Vehicles	China	112 cars provided to North Korea by September 1978.	001 to 1xx	Set beginning with 001 is likely retained as a special vehicle	Derivative of the Beijing Subway's DK3 Series. Some units converted into 1000 Series trains for Korean State Railway services. Some units can be still seen stored in the metro depot, which are occasionally in service as vintage trains on special occasions and public holidays.
	4-axle trailer car				Kim Chong-t'ae Electric Locomotive Works	North Korea		2xx		4 axle trailer cars built to lengthen DK4 sets to 3 or 4 cars.
Image	G "Gisela"	70 km/h	Contactor Control	1978–1983 Bought in 1996	LEW Hennigsdorf	GDR	120	5xx - 6xx	Retired in 2001	Ex-BVG trains from the Berlin U-Bahn bought second-hand in 1996 Most converted into 500 Series trains for Korean State Railway services after the trains were banned from operating in underground tunnels due to frequent and severe control stand fires.
Image	Jaju-ho (self-reliance type)	Unknown	Unknown (possibly Resistor Control)	Unknown (before 1974)	Kim Chong-t'ae Electric Locomotive Works	North Korea	Unknown	?	Unknown	Prototype train. Rode by Kim Jong Il in 1974 but is no longer in service and said to be stored in the Pyongyang Metro museum.
	Yonggwang-ho (glory type)				Kim Chong-t'ae Electric Locomotive Works			415		A model of the 3 door version exists in the metro museum, numbered 415. Seen in a 1995 news report, coupled to DK4 cars.
	D "Dora"	70 km/h	Contactor Control	1958–1965 Bought in 1999	O&K, DWM, AEG, Siemens	FRG	220 known carriages, although only 132 were recorded to be in service.	7xx, 8xx and 9xx	In service	Ex-BVG trains from the Berlin U-Bahn bought second-hand in 1998. Some class D sets have a next stop indicator installed.
Image	GKD5B	45 km/h	12V135Z Diesel engine	1996–1997	CNR Dalian	China	2		In service	Diesel-electric shunting locomotives, used to haul metro trains under overhead electrification section from tunnel portal to depot.
	Underground Electric Vehicle No. 1	Unknown	IGBT-VVVF Inverter and PMSM motors	2015	Kim Chong-t'ae Electric Locomotive Works (with Chinese-built components)	North Korea	8 (2 sets)	1xx (101 to 108)	In service	

== Tourism ==
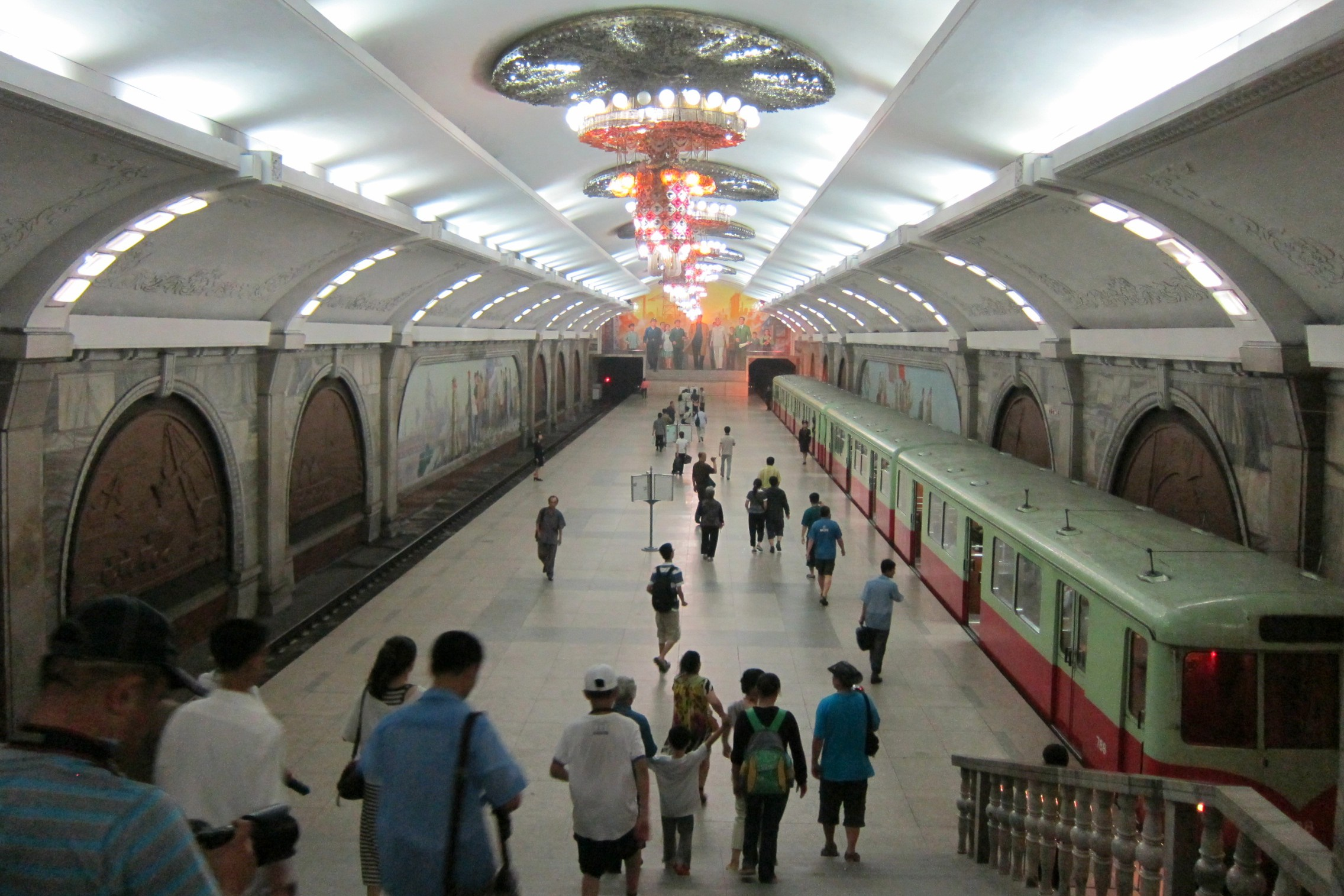
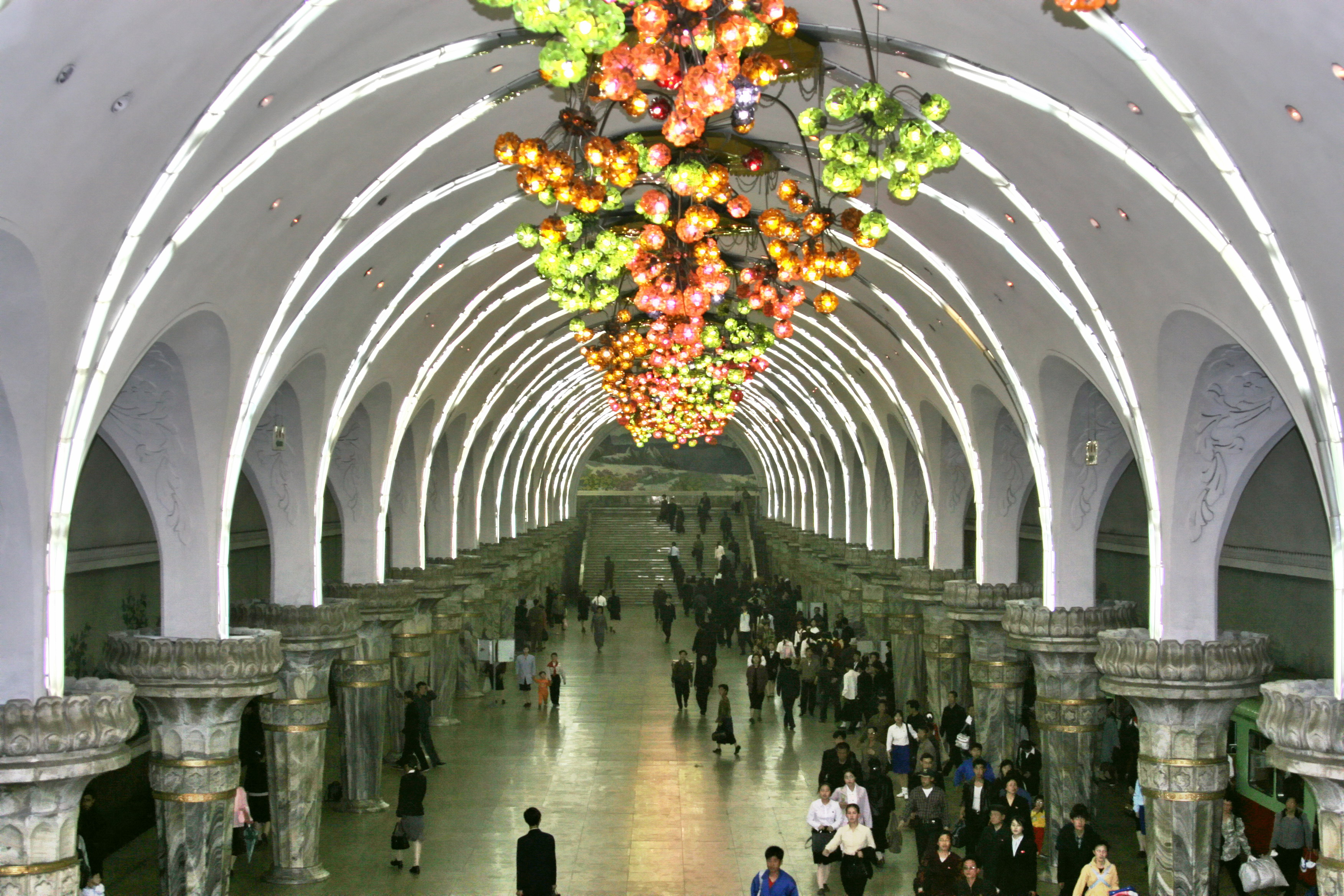
Before 2010, tourists were only allowed to travel between Puhŭng Station (left) and Yŏnggwang Station (right), sparking a now discredited conspiracy theory that the two stations comprised the entire system.

In general, tourism in North Korea is allowed only in guided groups with no diversion allowed from pre-planned itineraries. Foreign tourists used to be allowed to travel only between Puhŭng Station and Yŏnggwang Station. However, foreign students were allowed to freely use the entire metro system. Since 2010, tourists have been allowed to ride the metro at six stations, and in 2014, all of the metro stations were opened to foreigners. University students traveling with the Pyongyang Project have also reported visiting every station.

As of 2014, it is possible for tourists on special Public Transport Tours to take metro rides through both lines, including visits to all stations. In April 2014, the first tourist group visited stations on both metro lines, and it is expected that such extended visits to both metro lines will remain possible for future tourist groups.

The earlier restrictions on tourist access gave rise to a conspiracy theory that the metro existed only for display. According to this claim, which lacked evidence, the system had just two stations and the passengers were actors. With the entire network now open to foreign visitors, this idea has been discredited.

After the COVID-19 pandemic, the metro was restricted for tourists and tour groups, only residents of Pyongyang could use it.

=== Museum ===
Pyongyang Metro has its own museum. A large portion of the collection is related to President Kim Il Sung providing "on-the-spot guidance" to the workers constructing the system. Among the exhibits are a special funicular-like vehicle which the president used to descend to a station under construction (it rode down the inclined tunnels that would eventually be used by the escalators), and a railbus in which he rode around the system. The museum also has a map of the planned lines; it shows the Chollima and Hyoksin line terminating at a common station near Chilgol, the third line that would cross the Taedong River, eventually terminating near Rakrang and the locations of the depots, one far past the western terminus of the Hyoksin line and the depot in Sopo for the Chollima line.

== Gallery ==
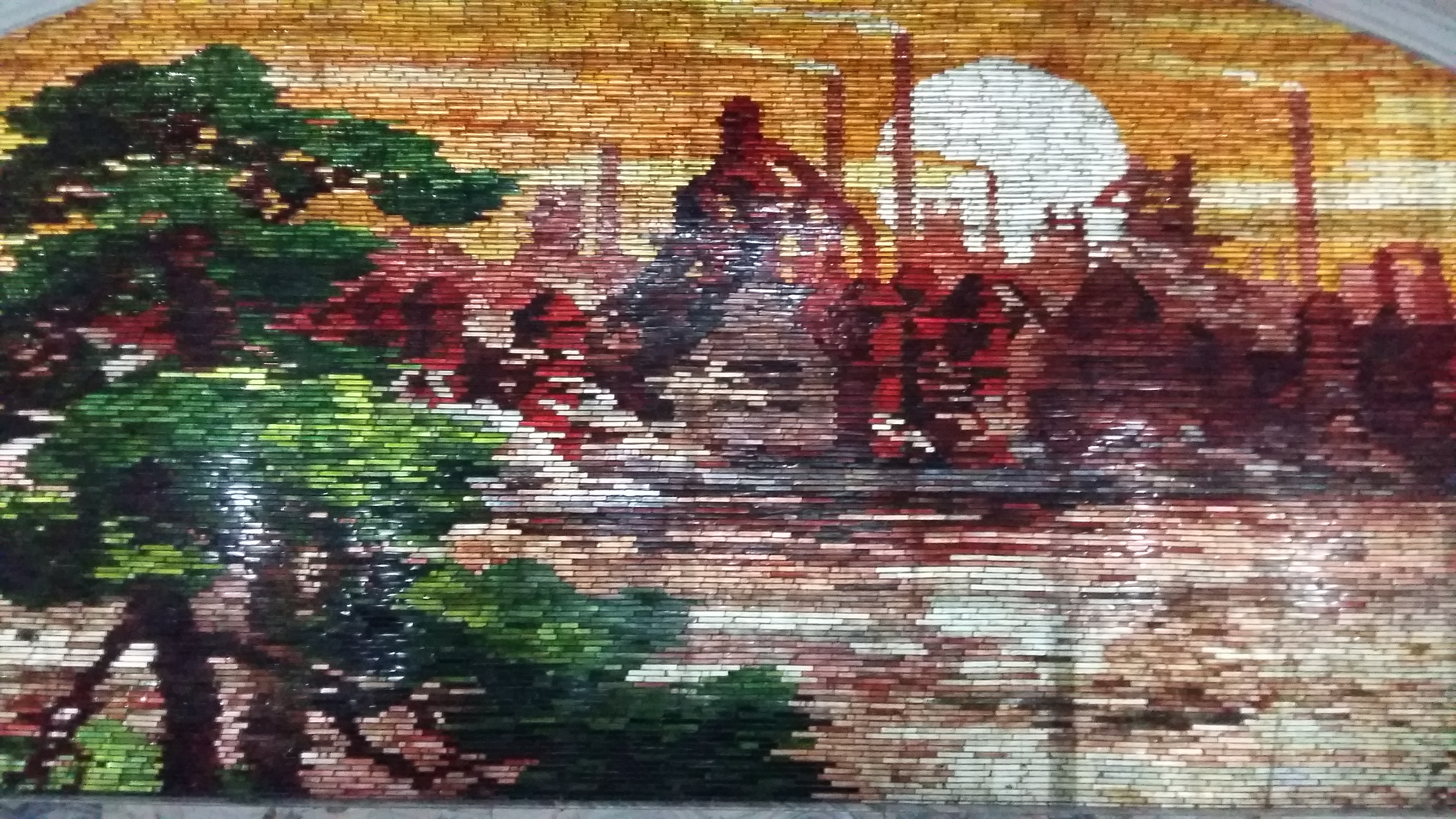
Mural at Puhŭng Station entrance

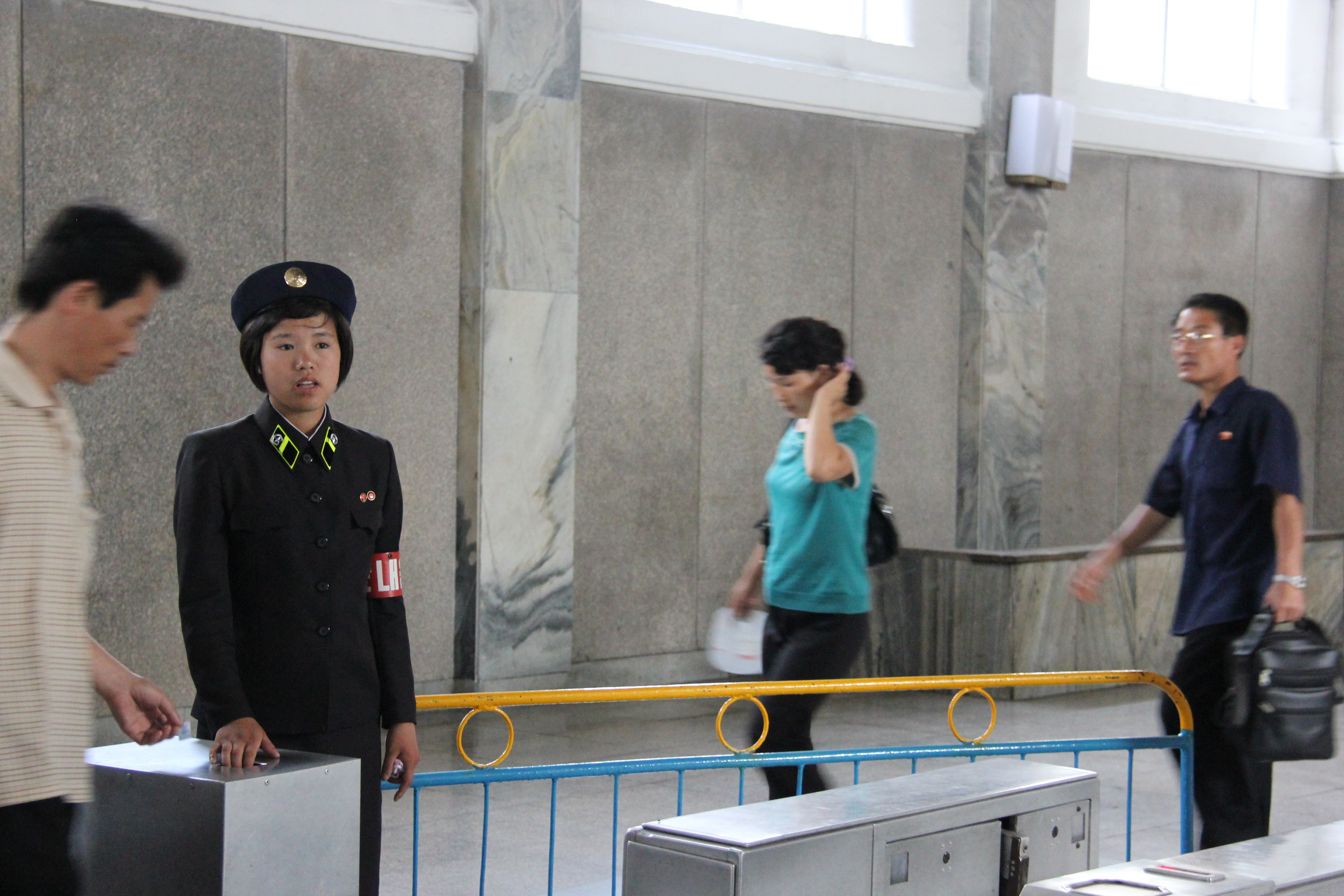
Staff in a military-style uniform

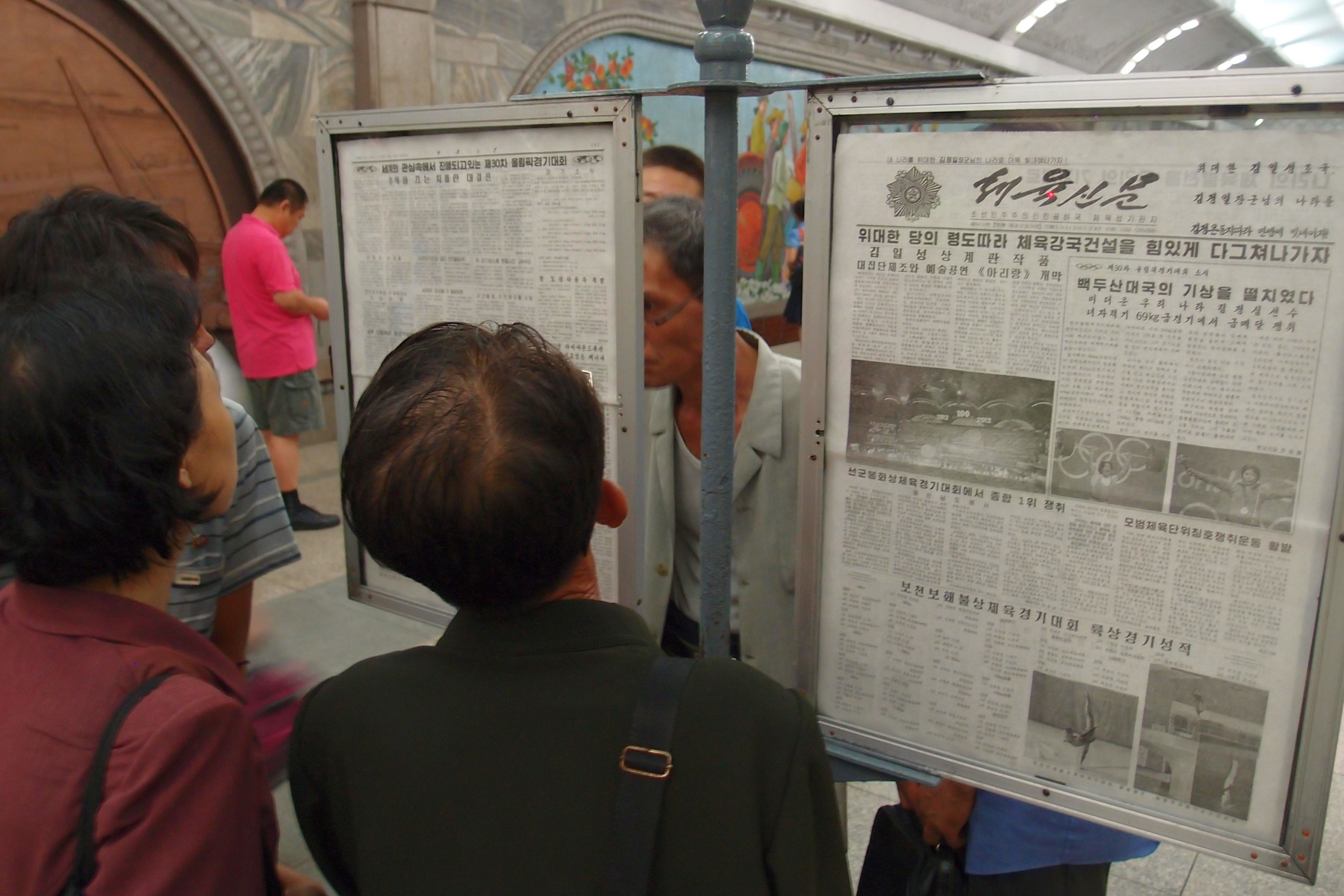
A public newspaper display on a platform

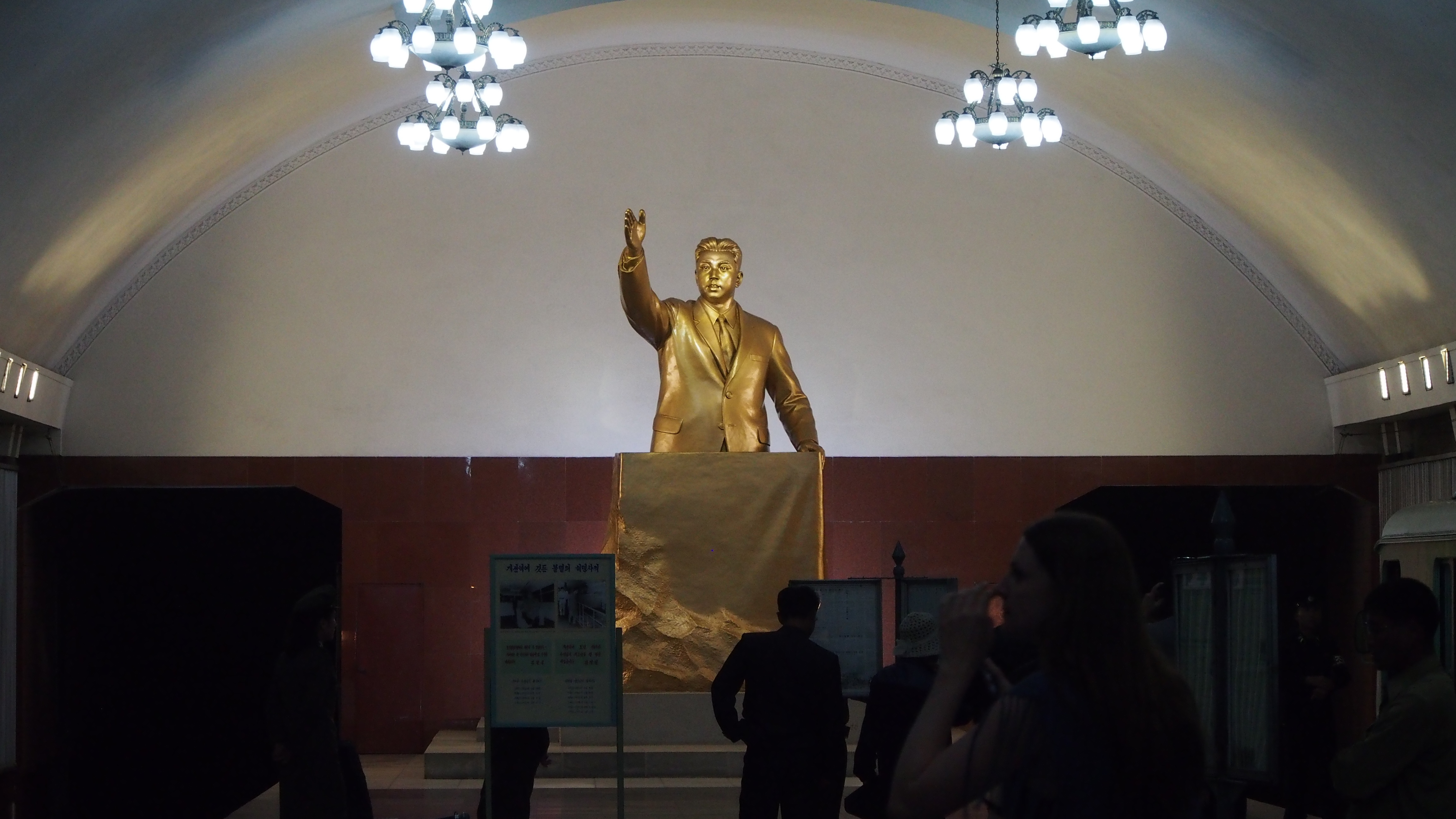
A statue of Kim Il Sung at Kaesŏn Station

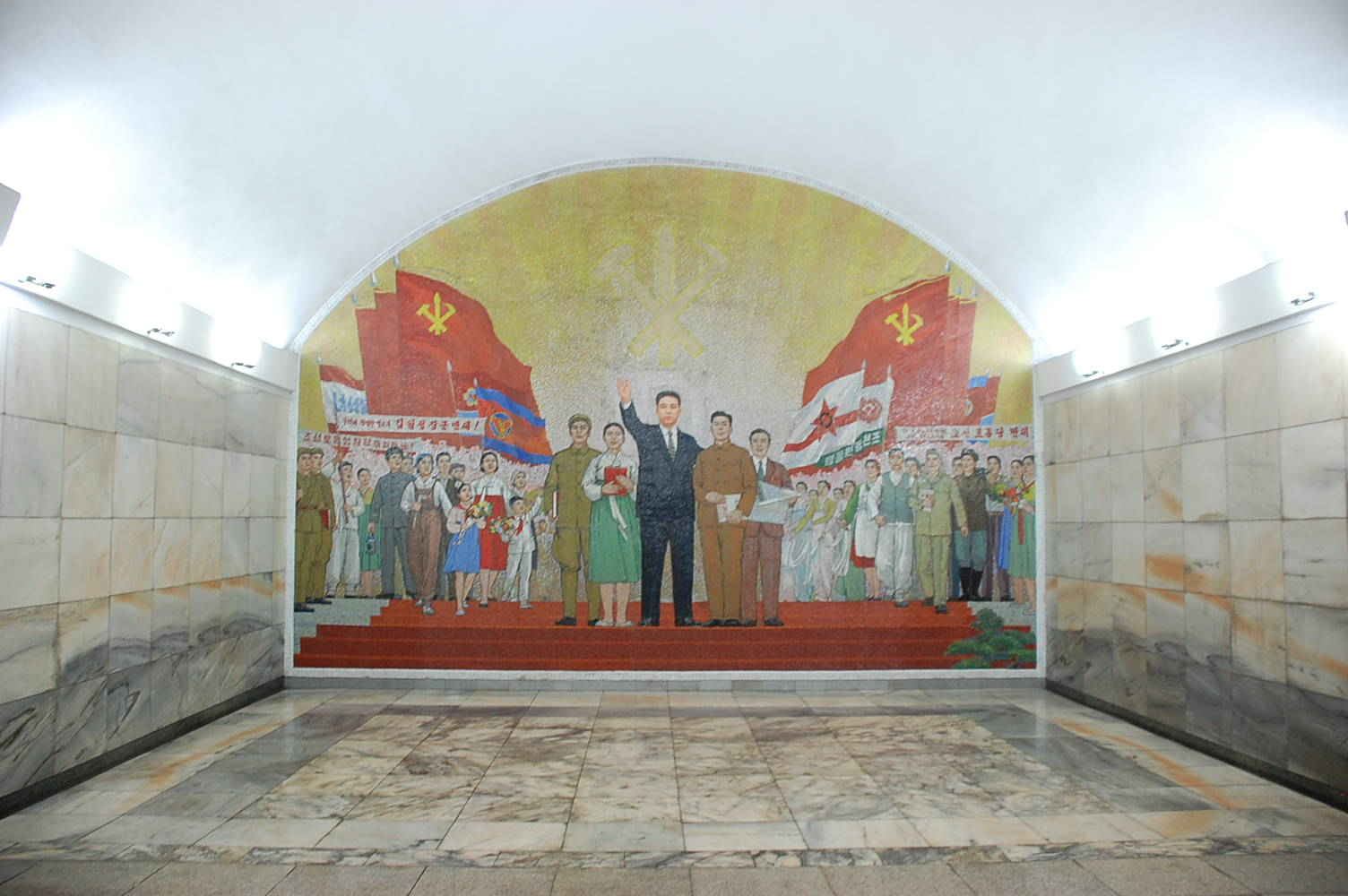
Socialist realist mural at Ponghwa Station

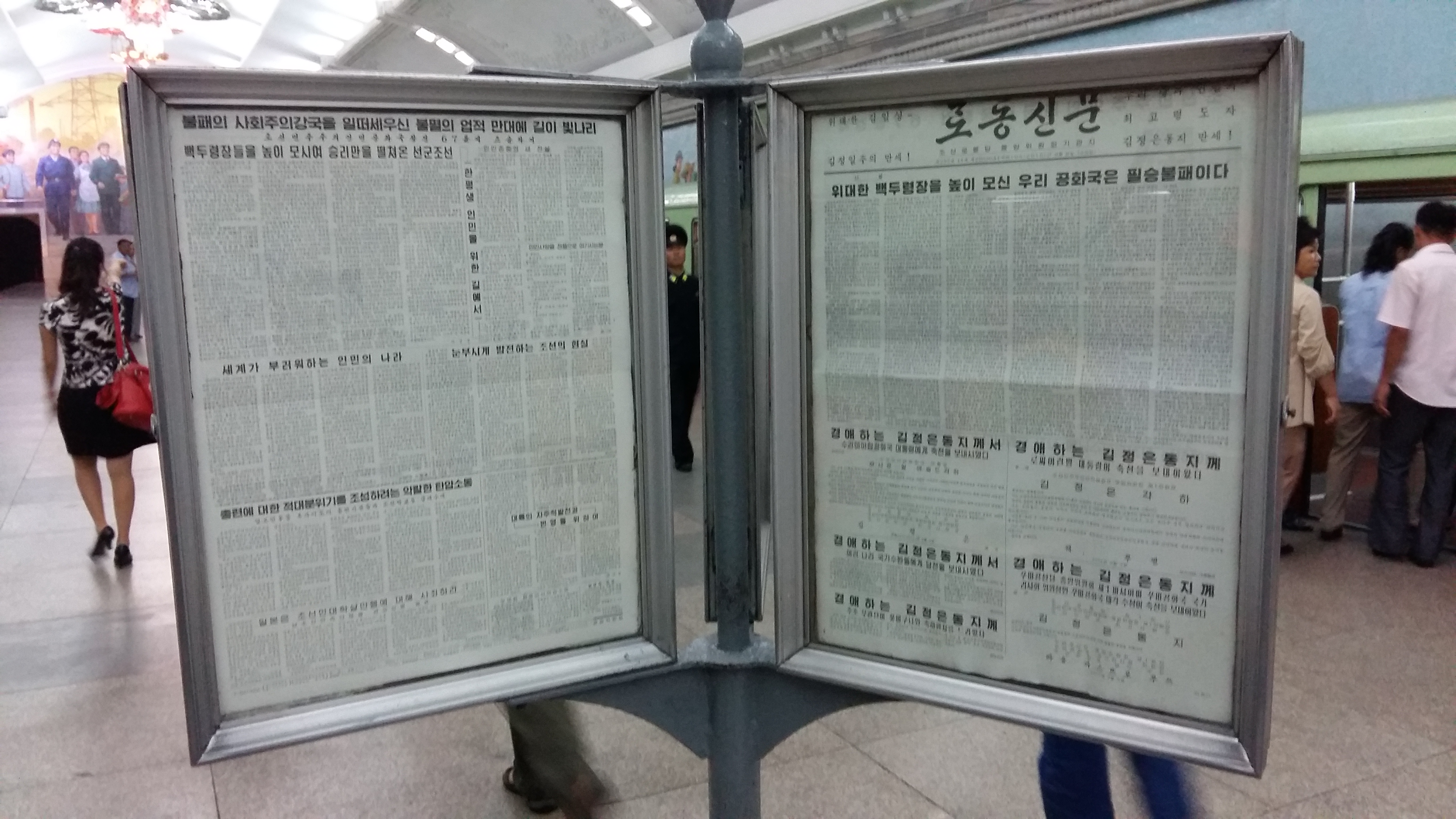
9 September 2015 newspaper at Puhŭng Station

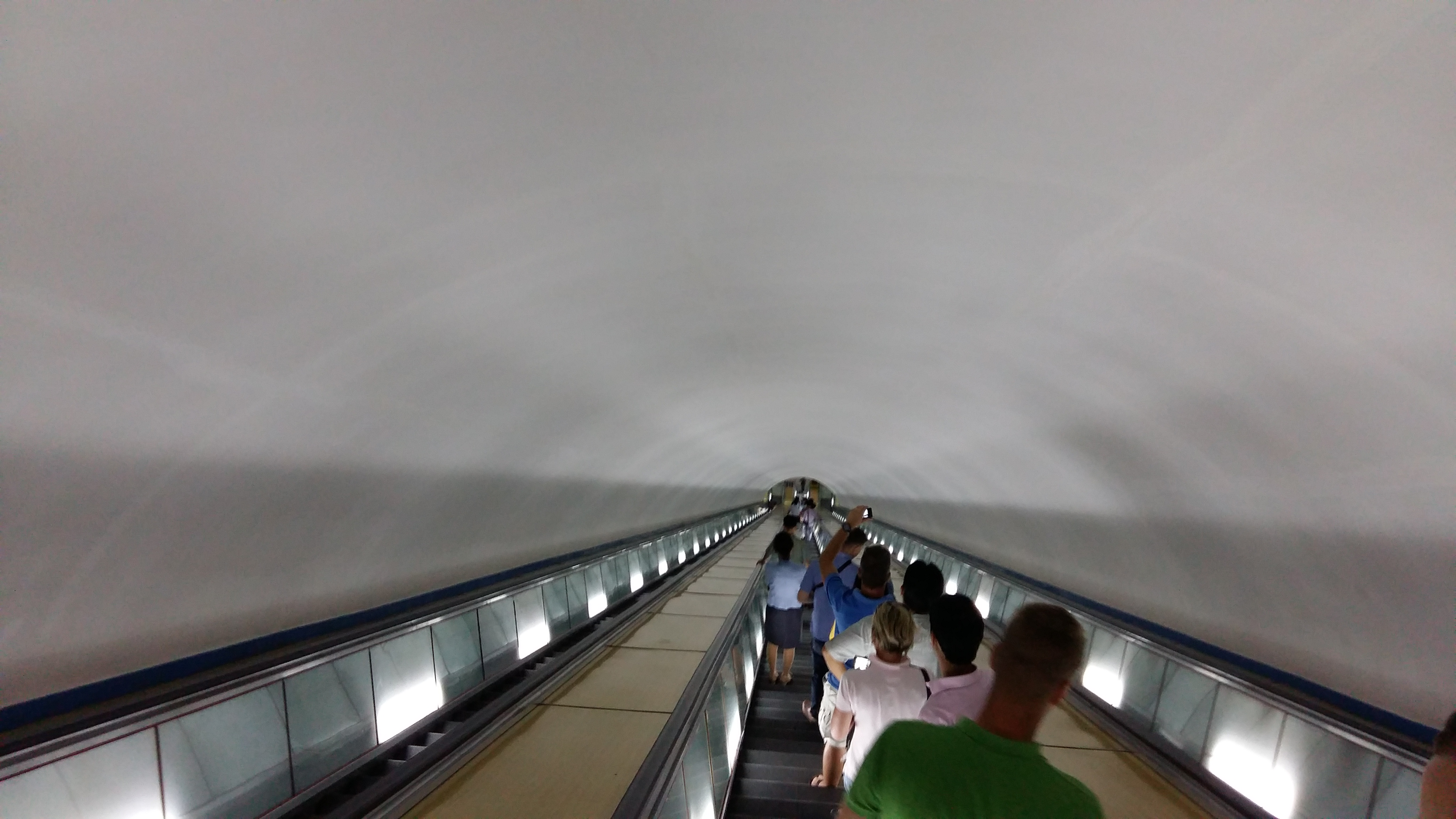
Escalators at Puhŭng Station

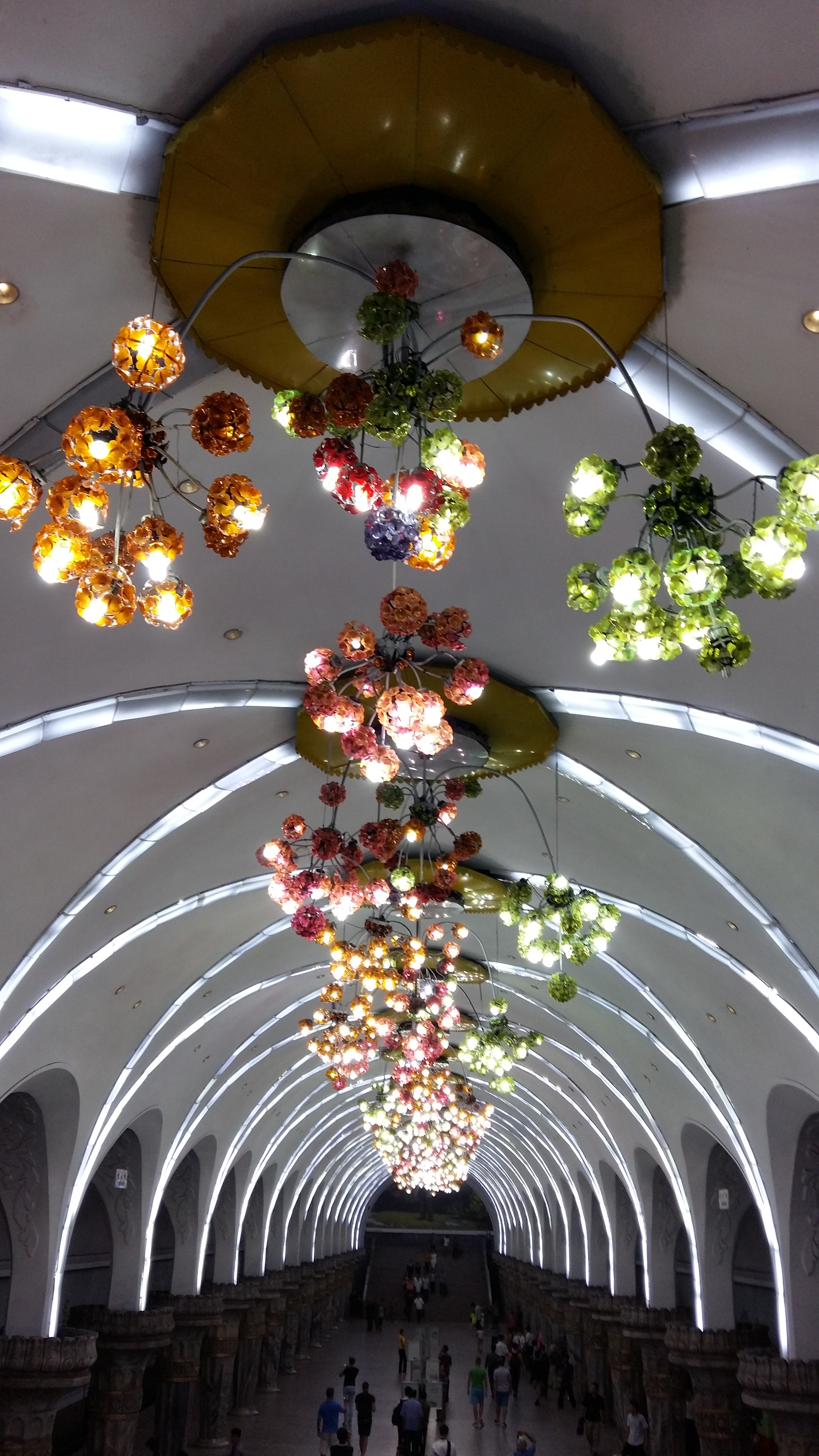
Chandelier at Yŏnggwang Station

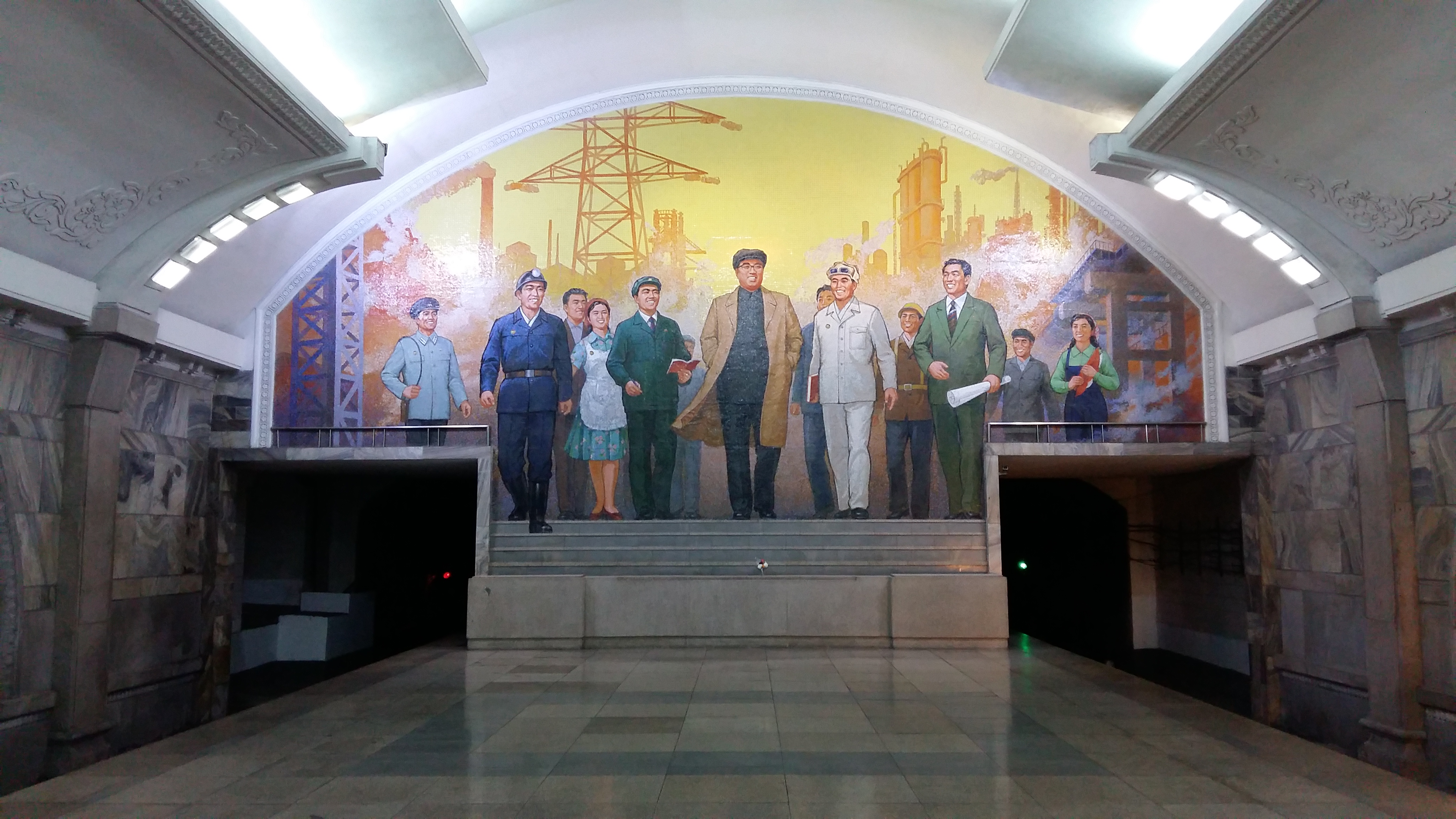
Mural at Puhŭng Station

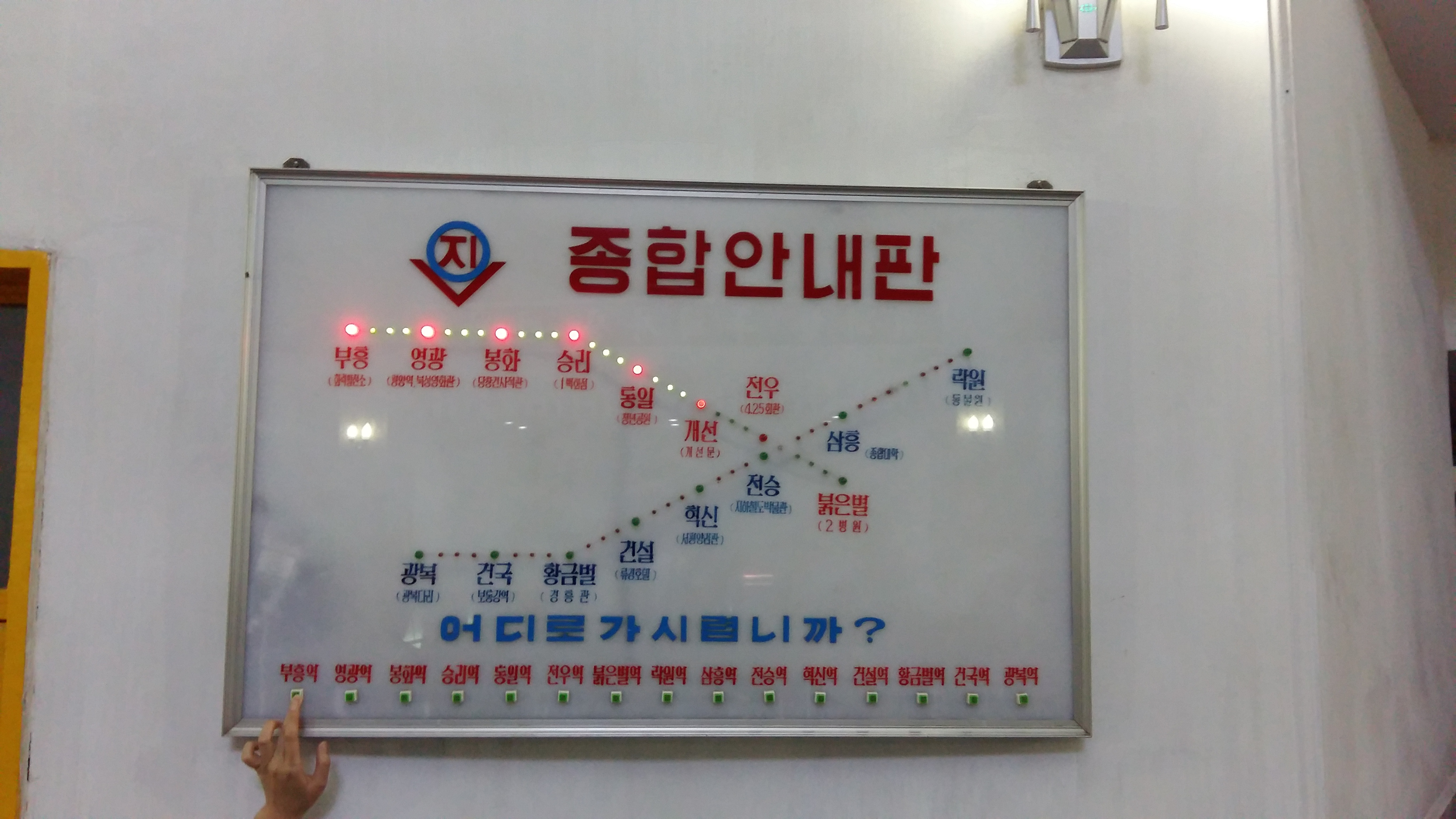
Pyongyang Metro map at Kaesŏn Station

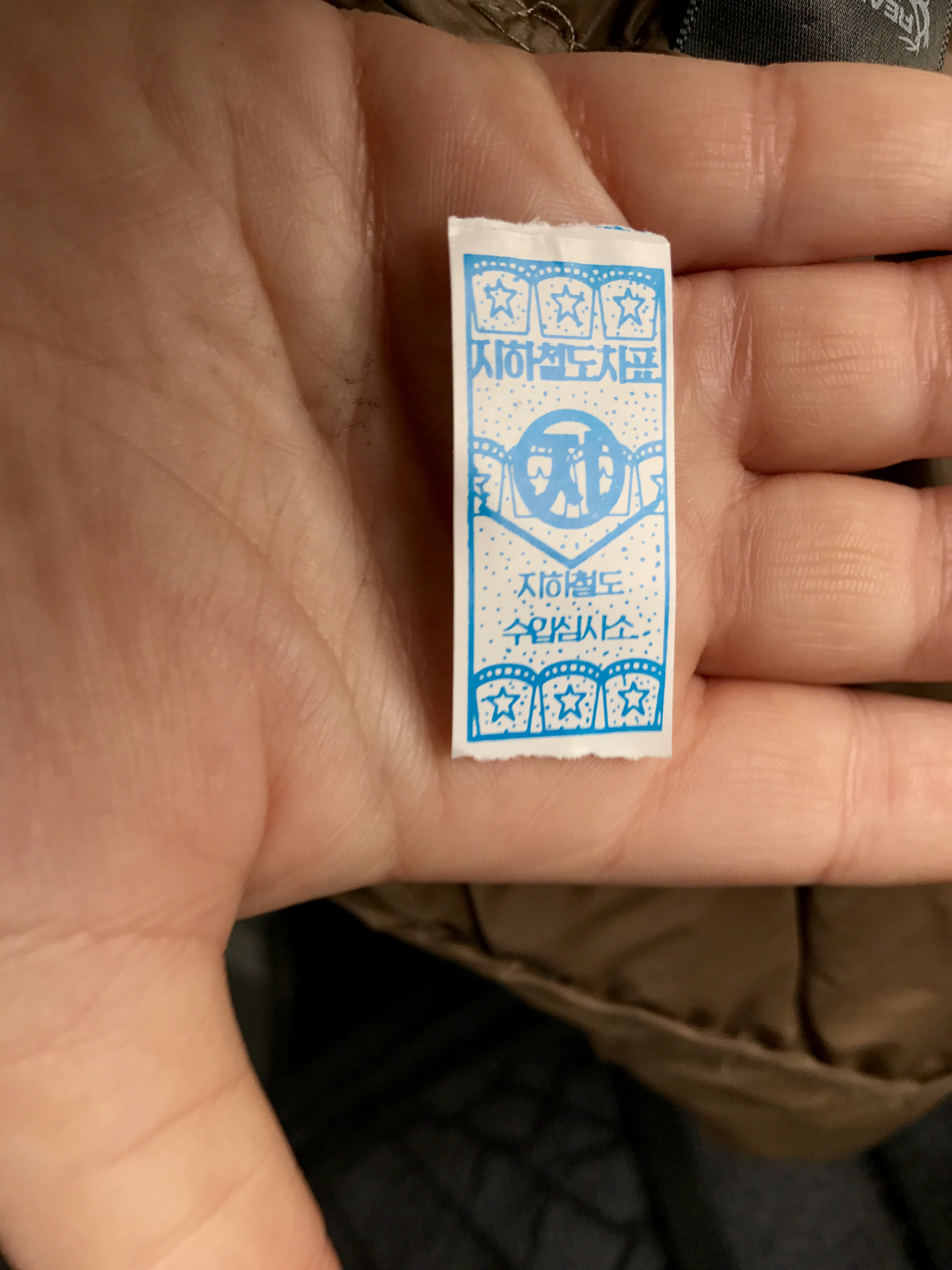
Pyongyang Metro ticket

== See also ==
- Trams in Pyongyang
- Rail transport in North Korea
