= Hyoksin station =

Pyongyang Metro station

Hyŏksin Station 혁신역
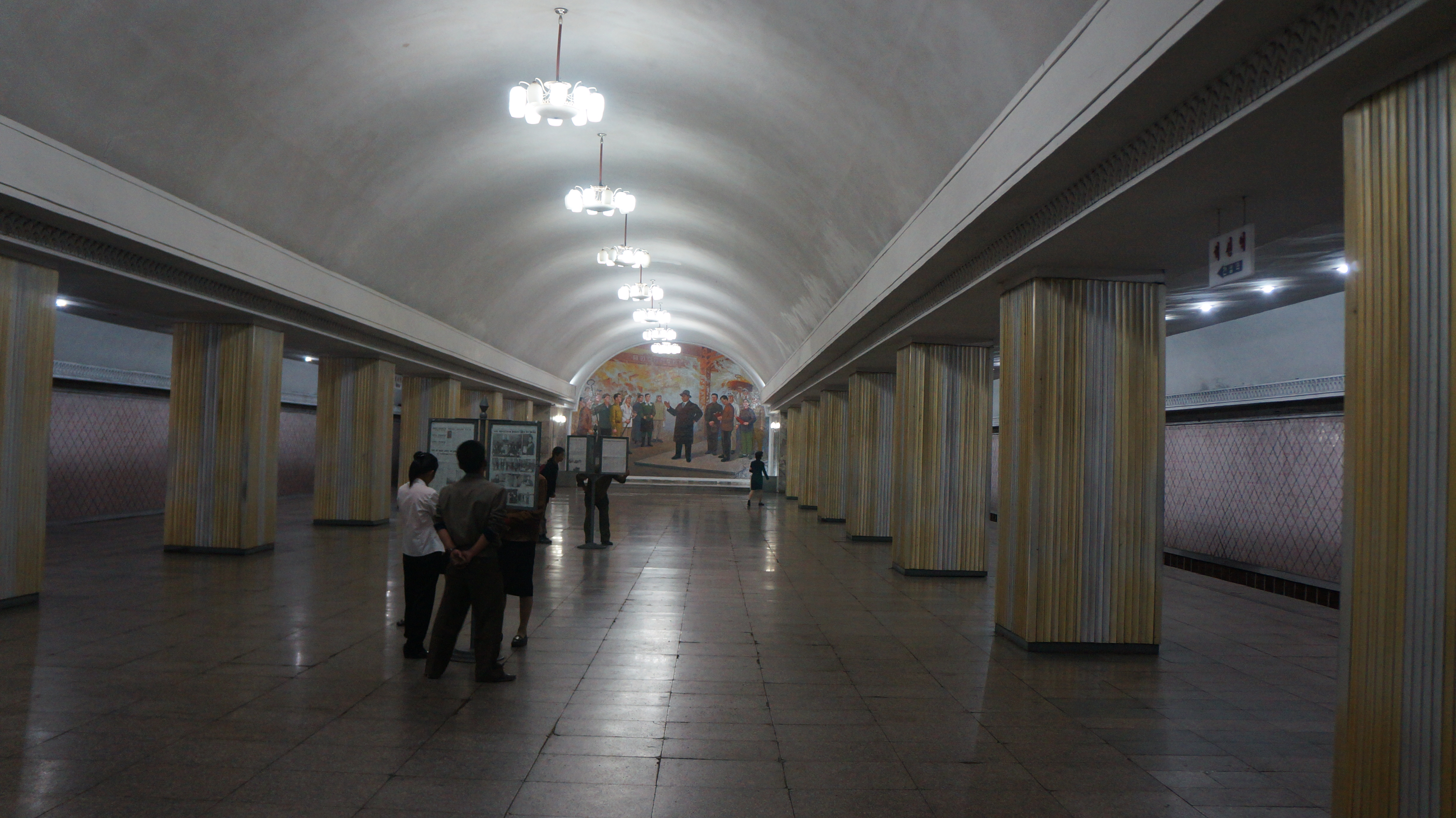

General information
- Location: Potonggang-guyok, Pyongyang; Democratic People's Republic of Korea
- Coordinates: 39°2′54.1″N 125°44′25.5″E

History
- Opened: 9 September 1975

Services
Preceding station	Pyongyang Metro	Following station
Konsol towards Kwangbok	Hyoksin Line	Chonsung towards Ragwon
Location

Hyŏksin Station (Korean: 혁신역; Hanja: 革新驛) is a station on Hyŏksin Line of the Pyongyang Metro, North Korea.

The station is across the street from a park and surrounded by residential and mixed use buildings.
