= Chollima Line =

Metro line in Pyongyang, North Korea

Pyongyang Metro Chŏllima Line
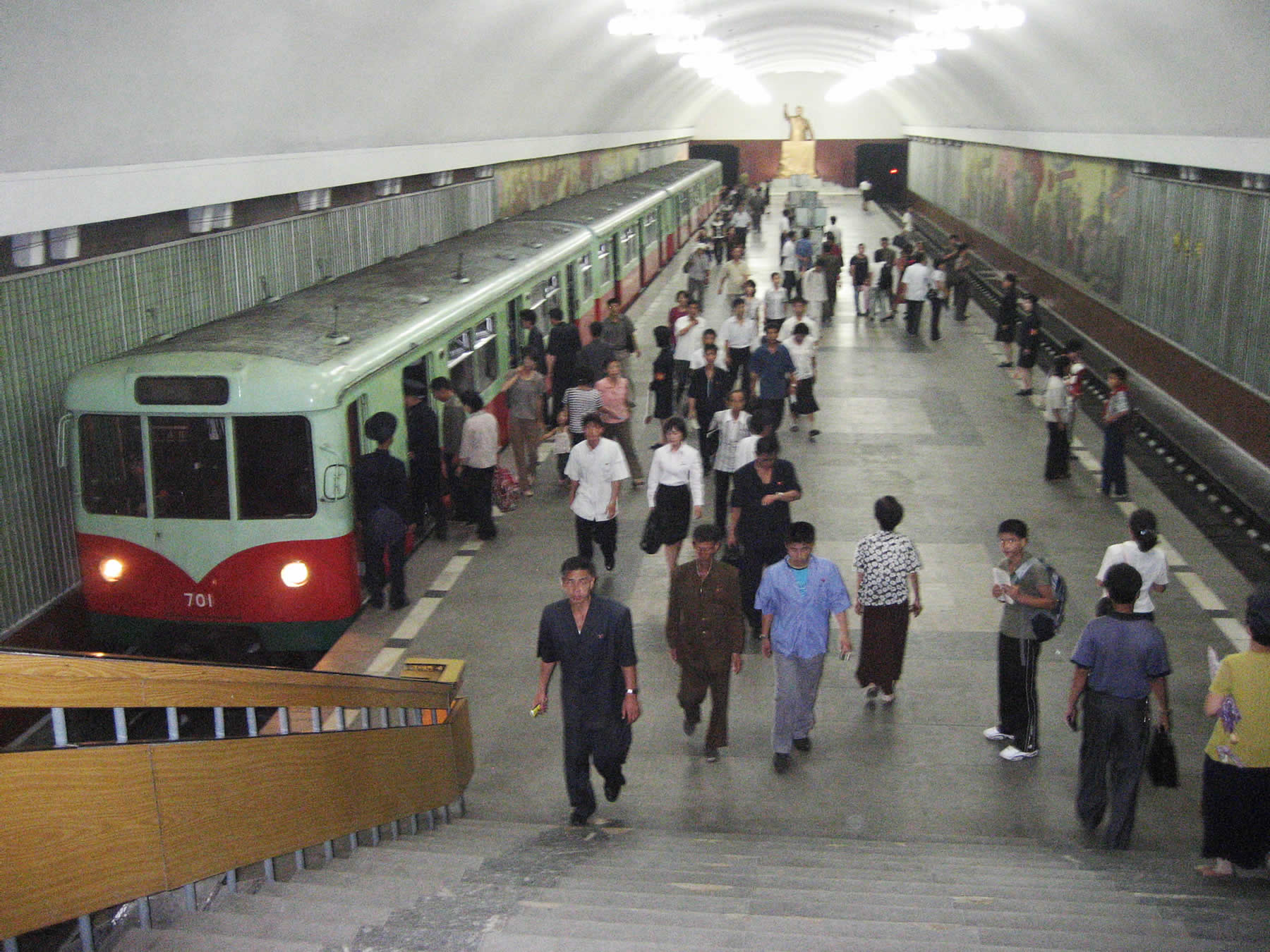
- View of the island platform at Kaesŏn Station.

Overview
- Owner: Pyongyang Metro
- Locale: Pyongyang
- Termini: Puhung; Pulgŭnbyŏl
- Stations: 8

Service
- Type: Rapid transit
- Operator: Pyongyang Metro
- Depot: Sopo
- Rolling stock: BVG Class D, Underground Electric Vehicle No. 1

History
- Opened: September 5, 1973; 53 years ago
- Last extension: 1987

Technical
- Line length: 8.9 km (5.5 mi)
- Track gauge: 1435mm
- Signalling: Automatic block signaling

The Chŏllima Line (Korean: 천리마선; Hancha: 千里馬線) is a rapid transit line owned and operated by Pyongyang Metro in Pyongyang, North Korea. The line has a depot at Sopo, near the Korean State Railway's Sopo station.

The section from Ponghwa station to Puhung station is also referred to as the Mangyongdae Line; nonetheless most sources refer to the metro system as having two lines. There are plans to extend the line from Puhung to Mangyongdae and from Pulgunbyol to Sopo, which already connects to the metro depot, but does not have third rail electrification. There was allegedly a plan to extend the line to Pyongsong in the 1980s.

In 1999, KBS reported that the third line was already under construction and scheduled to open for the 55th Party Foundation Day in 2000. It was to run from Kwangbok station to Mangyongdae.

In 2024, Thongil station was renamed to just "station", as shown by a tour of the metro system taken by Russian embassy staff. The name Thongil (Unification) was removed in accordance with Kim Jong-un's new belligerent policy toward South Korea. By September 2024, the station was renamed Moranbong.

== Stations ==
=== Chŏllima Line ===
Stations of the Pyongyang Metro
Chŏllima Line 천리마선 (千里馬線)
Station	Name in English	Transfer	Opened
Pulgŭnbyŏl (붉은별)	Red Star	Trolleybus Line 1	5 September 1973
Jŏnu (전우; 戰友)	Comrade / Comrade-in-arms	Hyŏksin Line (Jŏnsŭng) Trolleybus Line 1	5 September 1973
Kaesŏn (개선; 凱旋)	Triumphal Return / Triumphant Return	Trolleybus Line 1, 8	5 September 1973
Moranbong (모란봉역; 牡丹峰驛)	"Moran Hill" Trolleybus Line 1		5 September 1973
Sŭngni (승리; 勝利)	Victory	Trolleybus Line 1, 5, 6	5 September 1973
Ponghwa (봉화; 烽火)	Beacon		5 September 1973
Yŏnggwang (영광; 榮光)	Glory	P'yŏngyang Station (P'yŏngbu Line, P'yŏngnam Line, P'yŏngdŏk Line, P'yŏngra Line, P'yŏngŭi Line); Pyongyang Tram Line 1 Trolleybus Line 1, 2, 10	10 April 1987
Puhŭng (부흥; 復興)	Revival	Pyongyang Tram Line 3 Trolleybus Line 3	10 April 1987
