= Puhung station =

Pyongyang Metro station

Puhŭng station 부흥역
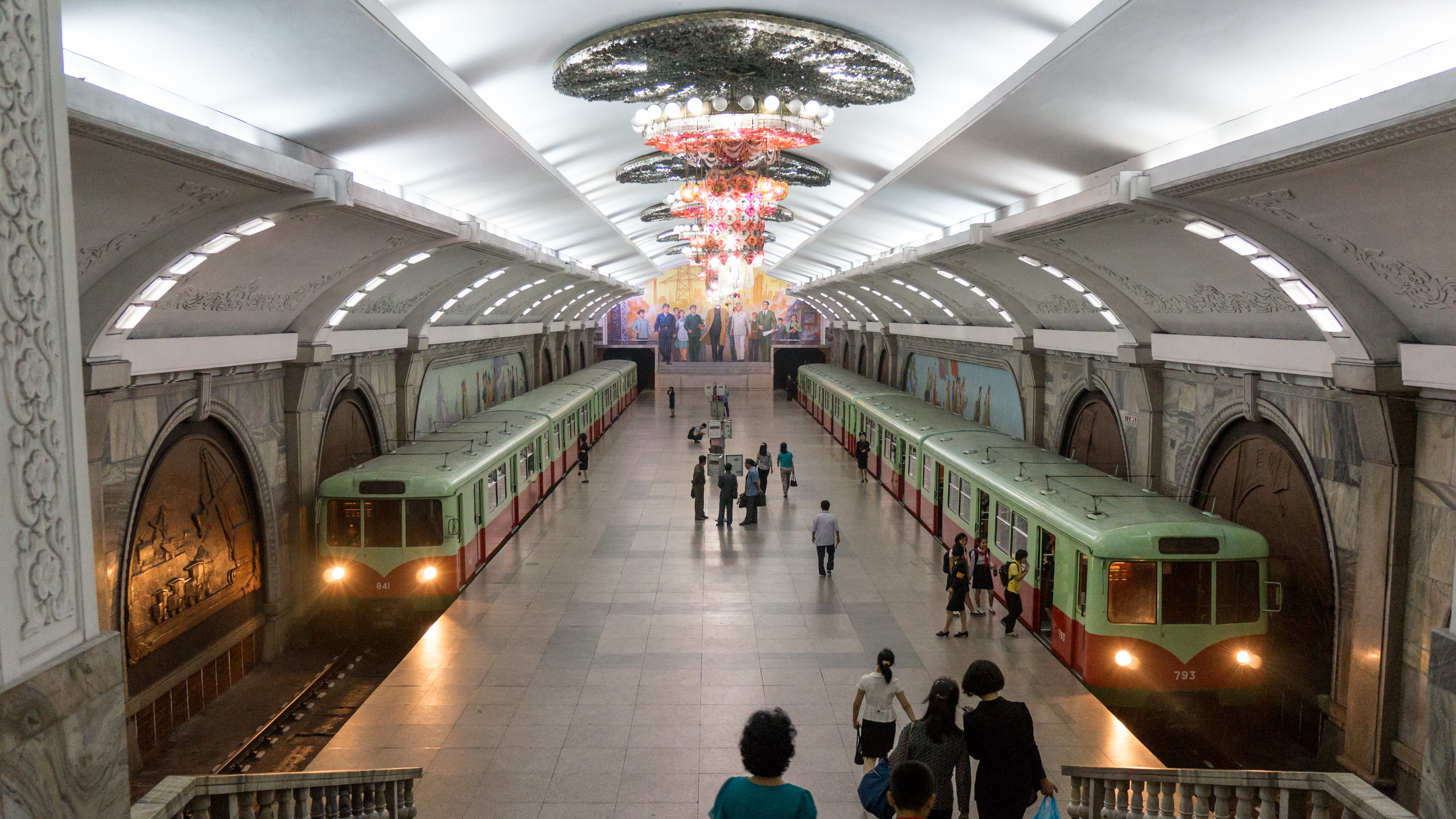
- View of the station's island platform prior to its renovation in 2025.

General information
- Location: Pyongchon-guyok, Pyongyang; Democratic People's Republic of Korea
- Coordinates: 39°0′38.3″N 125°45′3″E
- Owner: Pyongyang Metro
- Operator: Pyongyang Metro
- Platforms: 2 (1 island platform)
- Tracks: 2
- Connections: None

Construction
- Structure type: Underground
- Parking: None
- Cycle facilities: None
- Accessible: No

History
- Opened: 10 April 1987

Services
Preceding station	Pyongyang Metro	Following station
Terminus	Chollima Line	Yonggwang towards Pulgunbyol
Location

Puhŭng station is a metro station on the Mangyongdae Line of the Pyongyang Metro. It is the southern terminus of the Chollima Line. Before the rules were relaxed in 2010, it was one of the only two stations that tourists could visit, the other one being Yonggwang station, because these two stations are the most finely decorated in the system. These two stations were also the last two to be completed.

Puhŭng station features murals entitled The Great Leader Kim Il-sung Among Workers, A Morning of Innovation, and Song of a Bumper Crop.

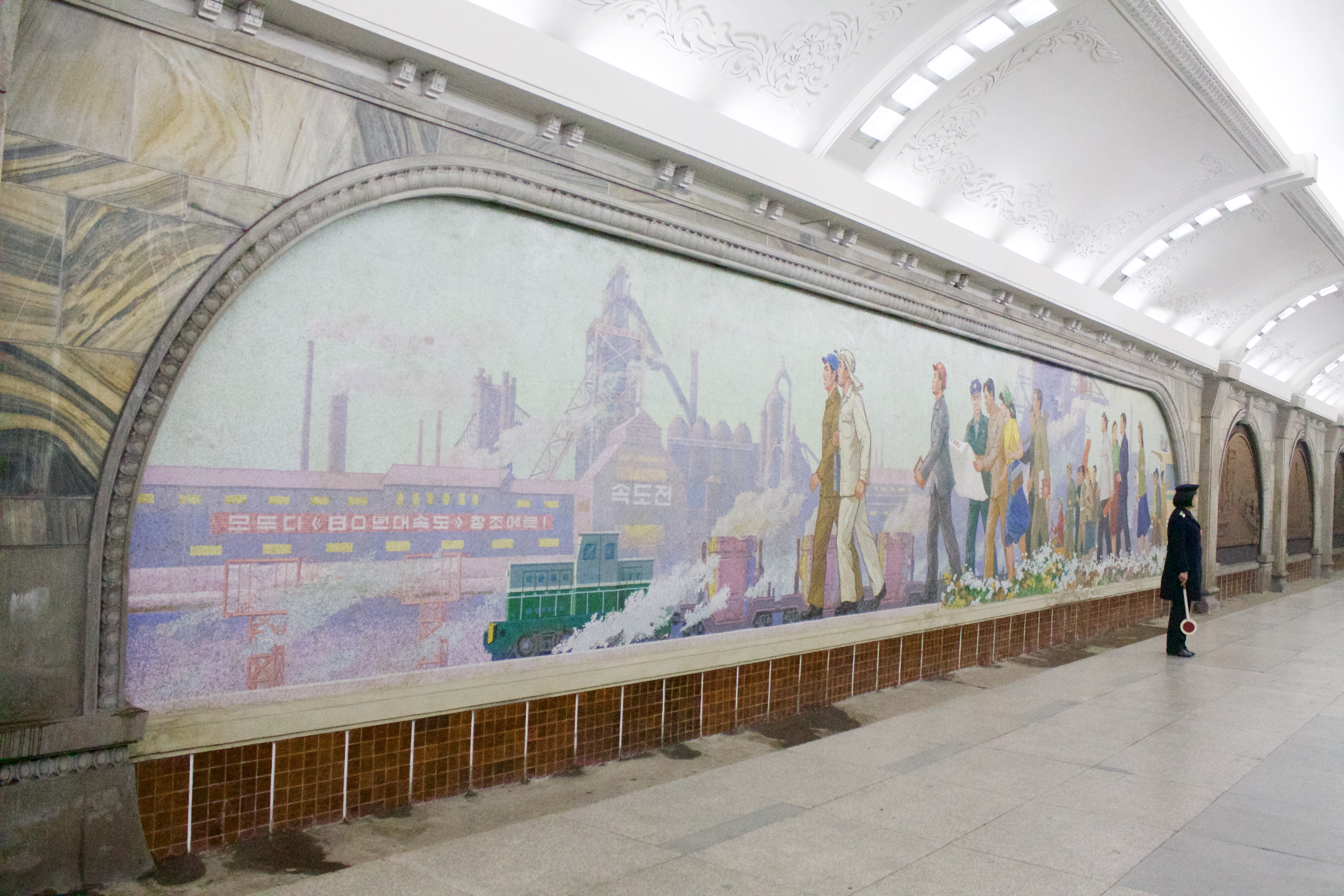
A Morning of Innovation

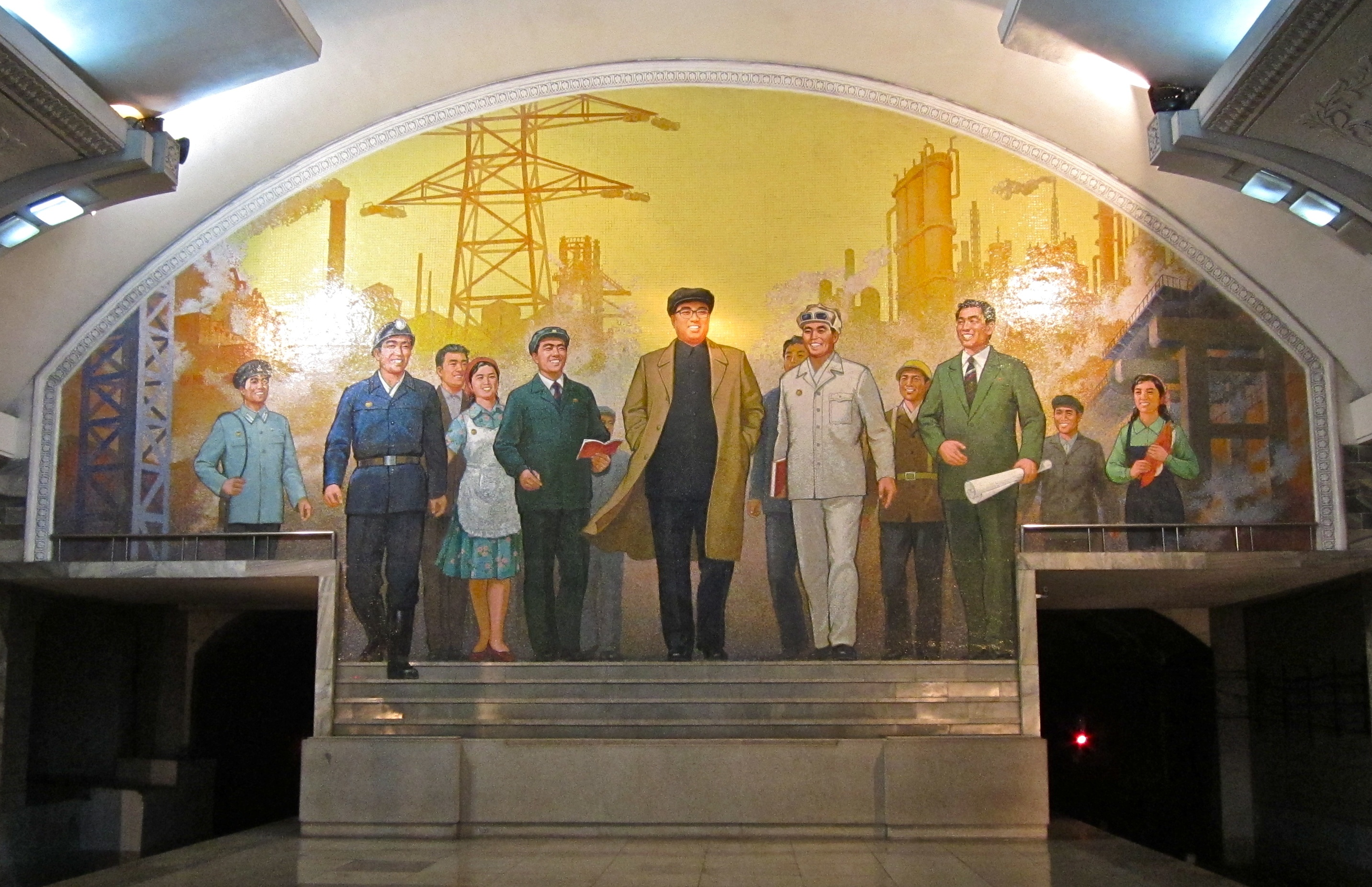
The Great Leader Kim Il-sung Among Workers

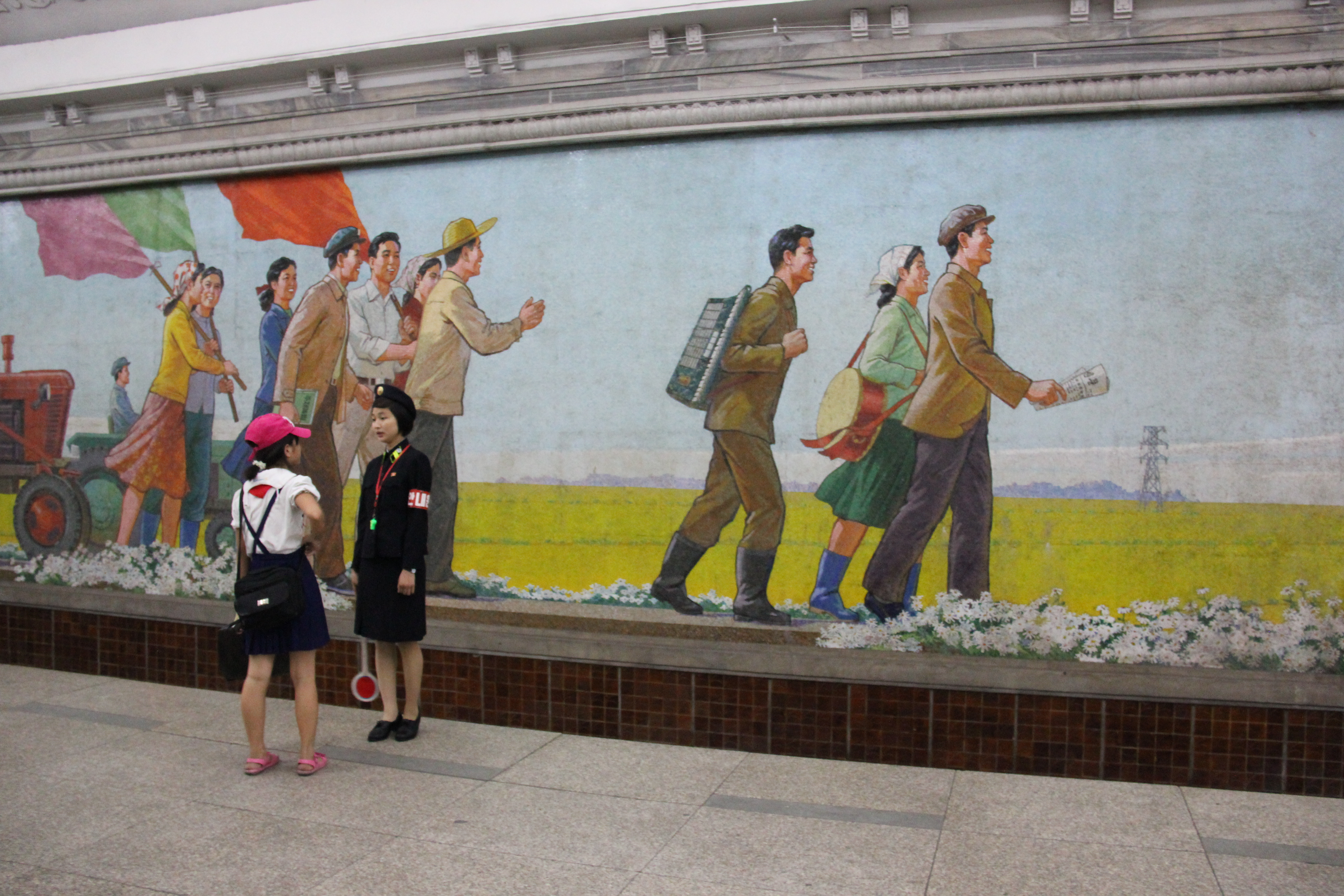
Song of a Bumper Crop
