= Pulgunbyol station =

Pyongyang Metro station

Pulgŭnbyŏl Station 붉은별역
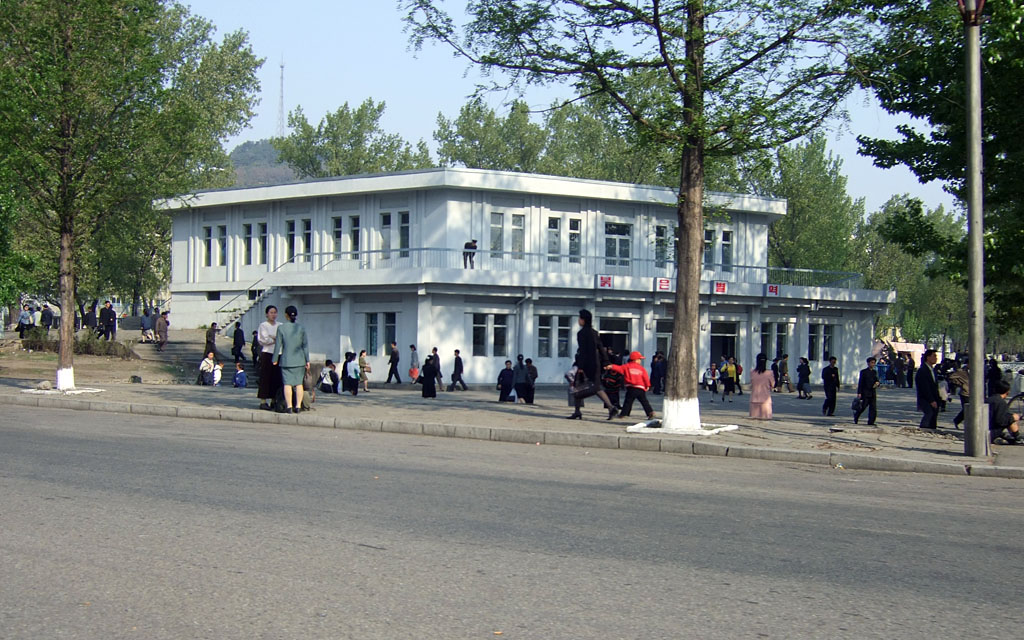

General information
- Location: Taesong-guyok, Pyongyang; Democratic People's Republic of Korea
- Coordinates: 39°1′59.4″N 125°45′24.6″E
- Platforms: 2
- Tracks: 2

Services
Preceding station	Pyongyang Metro	Following station
Jonu towards Puhung	Chollima Line	Terminus
Location

Pulgunbyol Station (lit. Red Star Station) is a station on Chŏllima Line of the Pyongyang Metro.

The station is a short walk to Mansudae Hill Grand Monument, Sungryong Hall and Three Revolutions Exhibit.
