= Ryomyong Condominium =

Residential development in Pyongyang, North Korea

Ryomyong Condominiums
- 려명거리 아빠트 (Korean)
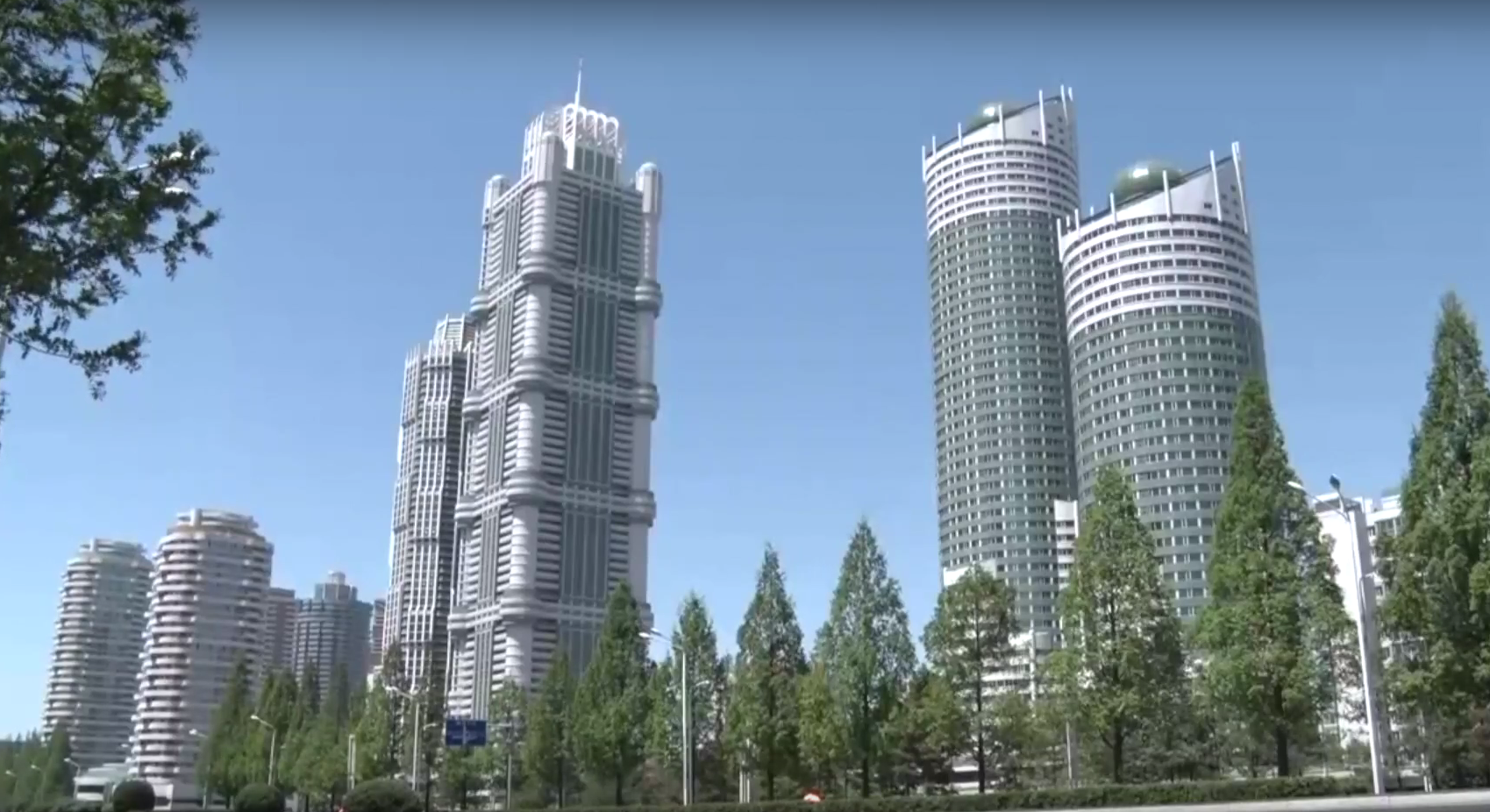
- Ryomyong Condominiums

- Location within Pyongyang

General information
- Location: Taesong-guyok, Pyongyang, North Korea
- Coordinates: 39°03′39.0″N 125°45′31.6″E
- Construction started: 2016
- Estimated completion: 2017

Technical details
- Floor count: 82

Ryomyong Condominiums (Korean: 려명거리 아빠트) are a six-tower residential development in Pyongyang, North Korea. The main tower, at 270 m (890 ft) (82 floors), is the third tallest inhabited building in North Korea, trailing only the unfinished 105-floor Ryugyong Hotel and the recently completed 80 floor Songhwa Street Main Tower, which is 30m higher than the Ryomyong Condominiums.

== History ==
Construction commenced in April 2016, and the construction of the fifth, 70-story apartment building in Myungmyeong was completed on 31 July 2016. On 24 August 2016, the Embassy of Russia released details of the construction internationally, including the completion of the main tower's frame. Exterior finishing work on the towers was completed on 13 April 2017, while interior finishing remained to be done by residents.

== Surrounding development ==
It is part of Ryomyong New Town. The heights of the six towers are as follows:

1. 82 floors 270 m (890 ft)
2. 70 floors 240 m (790 ft)
3. 55 floors 210 m (690 ft)
4. 50 floors 200 m (660 ft)
5. 45 floors 153 m (502 ft)
6. 35 floors 140 m (460 ft)

== See also ==
- List of tallest buildings in North Korea
- Ryomyong New Town

== Gallery ==
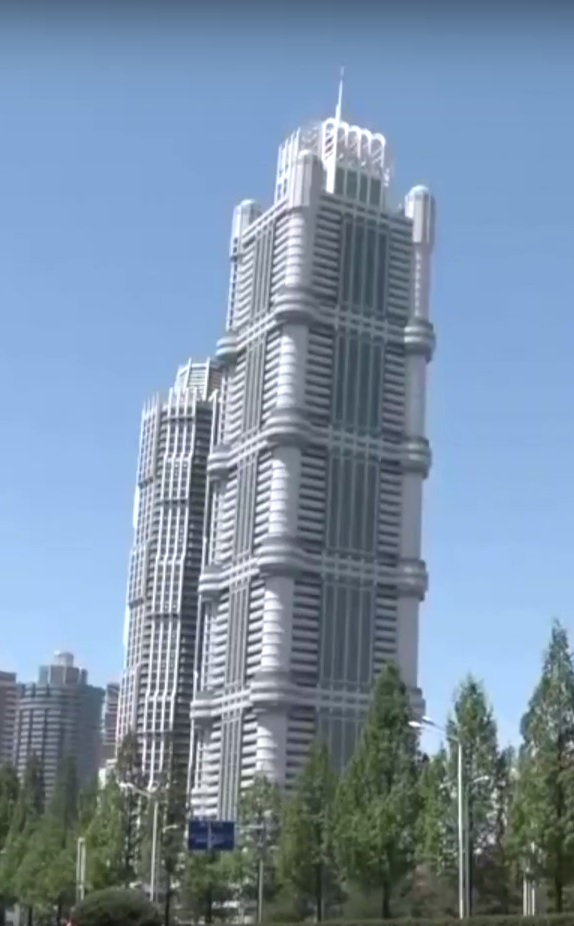
Building 1

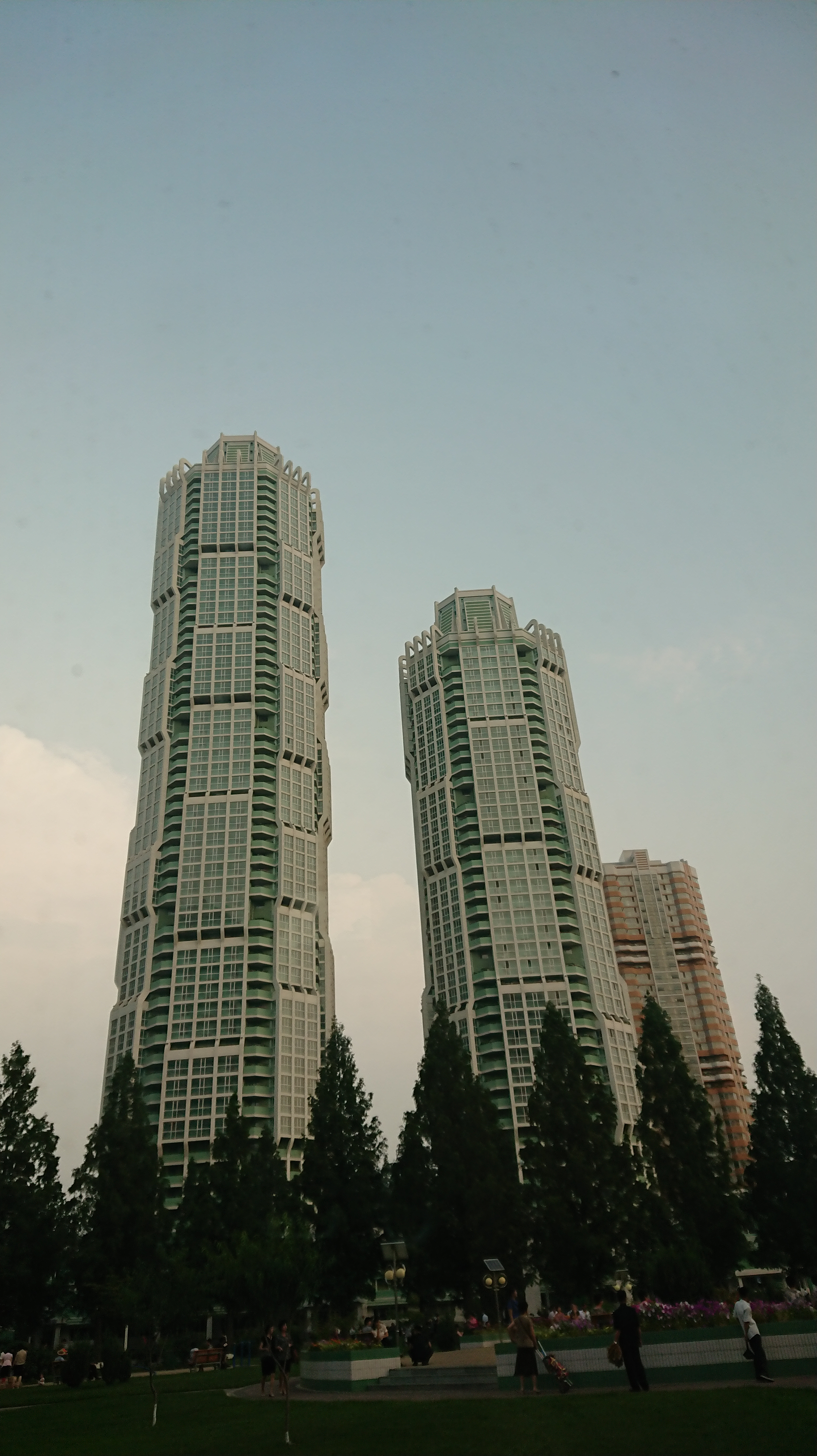
Building 2

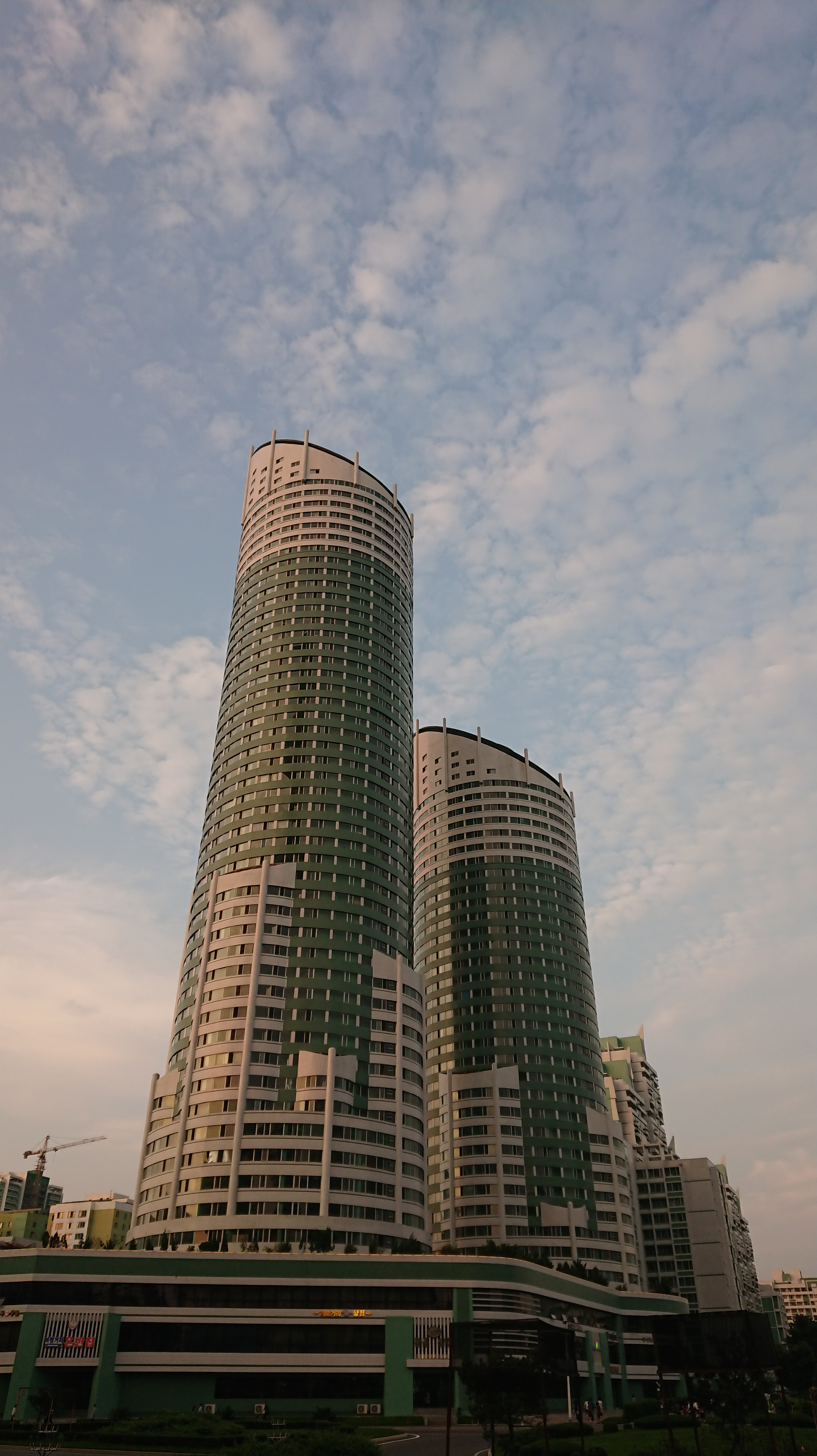
Building 3
