= List of tallest buildings in North Korea =

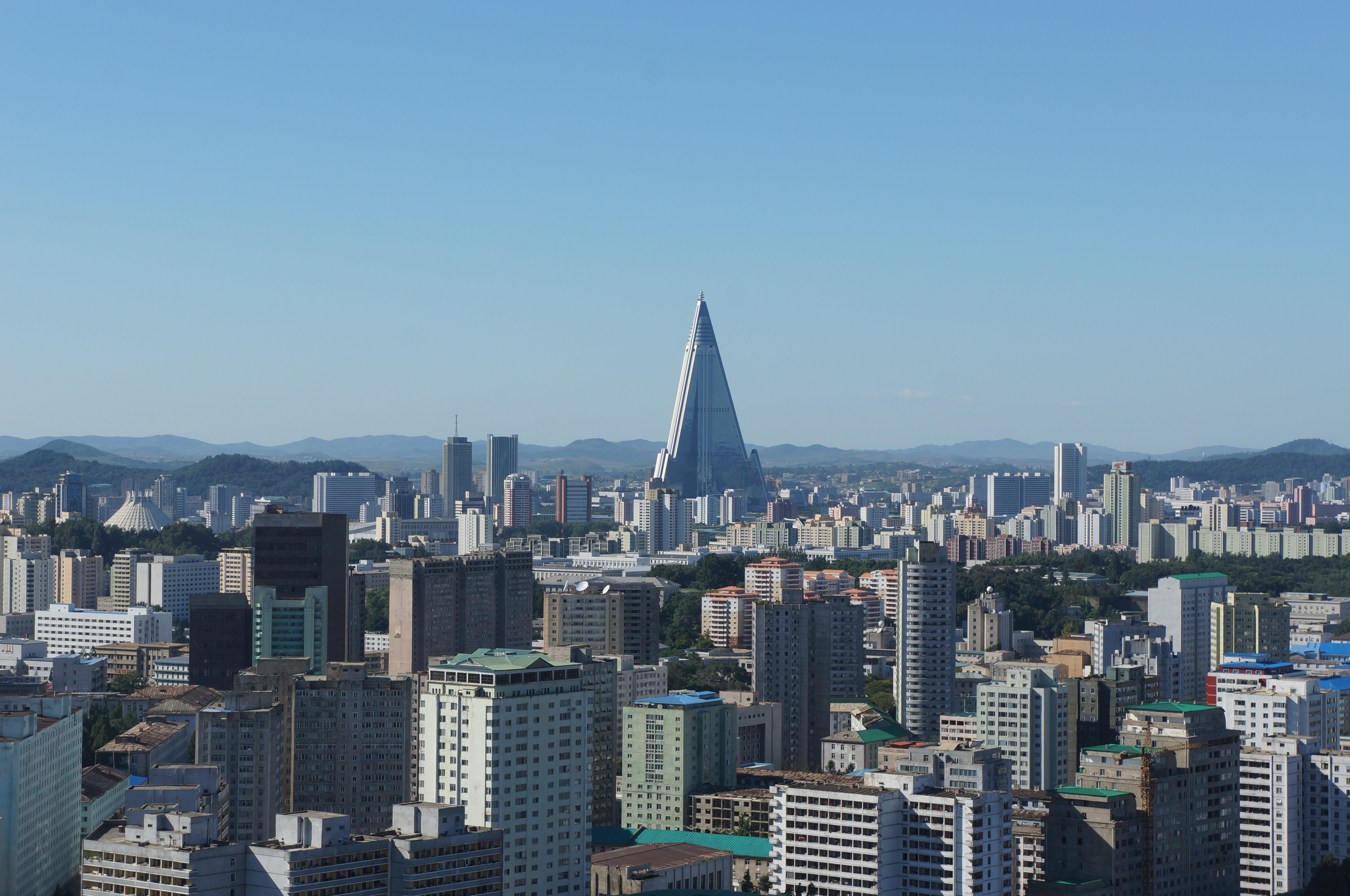
Pyongyang skyline in 2013

This list of tallest buildings in North Korea ranks the tallest buildings in Democratic People's Republic of Korea, commonly known as North Korea, by height. The tallest buildings are almost exclusively found in the capital city of Pyongyang, and most of them are either hotels or residential buildings.

== Buildings over 150 m ==
This section contains a list of completed and topped-out buildings in North Korea that stand at least 150 metres (492 ft) tall, based on standard height measurement which includes spires and architectural details, but excludes antenna masts. An equal sign (=) following a rank indicates the same height between two or more buildings.

Name	Image	Height m (ft)	Floors	Year	Location	Notes
Ryugyong Hotel		330 m (1,080 ft)	105	2011	Pyongyang; 39.0212°N 125.4351°E	Tallest building in Pyongyang and subsequently in North Korea after being topped-out in 1992. The estimated completion is still unknown. The exterior construction however was completed as of July 14, 2011.
Songhwa Street Main Tower		300 m (980 ft)	80	2022	Pyongyang; 38.99950°N 125.80078°E	Tallest residential building in North Korea, completed in 2022. Three top floors are service floors.
Ryomyong Street Apartment Building 1		270 m (890 ft)	70	2017	Pyongyang; 39.06098°N 125.75887°E	
Jonwi Street Main Tower		250 m (820 ft)	80	2024	Pyongyang	Construction began in February 2023 and was topped out in October of that year. The building's exterior was revealed during the WPK yearend party plenum on state television in early January 2024. The building along with the entire complex was inaugurated on 15 May 2024.
Ryomyong Condominium 2		240 m (790 ft)	55	2017	Pyongyang; 39.06098°N 125.75887°E	
Mirae Unha Tower		210 m (690 ft)	53	2015	Pyongyang; 38.9937°N 125.7304°E	
Ryomyong Condominium 3		210 m (690 ft)	55	2017	Pyongyang; 39.75887°N 125.75887°E	
Ryomyong Condominium 4		200 m (660 ft)	50	2017	Pyongyang; 39.75887°N 125.75887°E	
Taedong Residences 1		172 m (564 ft)	50	2015	Pyongyang	
Yanggakdo International Hotel		170 m (560 ft)	45	1995	Pyongyang; 38.9993°N 125.7519°E	
Kim Chaek University of Technology Tower 1		165 m (541 ft)	46	2015	Pyongyang; 39.010°N 125.4447°E	
Kim Chaek University of Technology Tower 2		165 m (541 ft)	46	2015	Pyongyang; 39.010°N 125.4447°E	
KISU Residential Tower 1		153 m (502 ft)	45	2013	Pyongyang; 39.0605°N 125.7536°E	
Ryomyong Condominium 5		150 m (490 ft)	40	2017	Pyongyang	
KWP Scientists Apartment		150 m (490 ft)	42	1986	Pyongyang; 39.0327°N 125.7287°E	
Future Scientists Street Twin Tower 1		150 m (490 ft)	38	2016	Pyongyang	
Future Scientists Street Twin Tower 2		150 m (490 ft)	38	2016	Pyongyang	
Ryonghung-Dong Apartment		150 m (490 ft)	35	2010	Pyongyang; 39.0604°N 125.7556°E	
Pukmang Tower 1		150 m (490 ft)	32	1984	Wonsan	Tallest building in North Korea outside of Pyongyang.

== Buildings lower than 150 m ==
This section contains a list of completed and topped-out high-rise buildings that stand below 490 feet (149 m) tall.

Name	Image	Height m (ft)	Floors	Year	Location	Notes
Koryo Hotel 1		148 m (486 ft)	40	1985	Pyongyang; 39.0314°N 125.4499°E	
Taedong Residences 2		148 m (486 ft)	32	2015	Pyongyang	
Mansudae Apartments 1		146 m (479 ft)	45	2012	Pyongyang	
Mansudae Apartments 2		146 m (479 ft)	45	2012	Pyongyang	
Kwangbok Street 1		144.3 m (473 ft)	42	1989	Pyongyang; 39.0347°N 125.6932°E	
Pyongyang Information Center		139.9 m (459 ft)	42	1986	Pyongyang; 39.0357°N 125.7276°E	
Pyongyang Secretariat Housing		133.2 m (437 ft)	40	1987	Pyongyang; 39.0381°N 125.7367°E	
Ryomyong Condominium 6		130 m (430 ft)	35	2017	Pyongyang	
Chongnyon Hotel		107 m (351 ft)	30	1989	Pyongyang; 39.0258°N 125.6813°E	
Sosan Hotel		103 m (338 ft)	30	1989	Pyongyang; 39.0038°N 125.4133°E	

== Tallest structures ==
This is a list of structures that are at least 150 metres (492 ft) tall.

Name	Image	Location	Height	Floors	Year	Note
Juche Tower		Pyongyang; 39.0176°N 125.7637°E	170 m (560 ft)	2	1982	It is the world's tallest stone tower.
Pyongyang TV Tower		Pyongyang	150 m (490 ft)	3	1967	

== Under construction ==
These are buildings under construction in North Korea.

Name	Location	Height	Floors	Year	Note
Koryo Hotel 3	Pyongyang	158 m (518 ft)	45	N/A	Construction began in 2012 and stopped at the end of 2013. It was scheduled to open before 2018 PyeongChang Winter Olympics and after construction on the hotel resumed.

== Proposed buildings ==
These are proposed buildings in the North Korea with a minimum of 40 floors and a height of 138 metres (453 ft)

Name	Location	Height	Floors	Note
KKG Avenue	Pyongyang	274 m (899 ft)	63	It was a vision to build a service and hotel centre. Currently, Mirae Scientists Street is another Another project is being implemented at the construction site.
Wonsan Hotel	Wonsan	210 m (690 ft)	60	Construction of a new five-star hotel is planned in Wonsan. The new hotel could accommodate 1,000 people and be located along the beach in Wonsan. Construction of the hotel is planned to last 26 months.
KKG Avenue Hotel 1	Pyongyang	192 m (630 ft)	50	A new hotel complex will be built starting in 2008. Currently, this area is located on Mirae Scientists Street .
KKG Avenue Hotel 2	Pyongyang	192 m (630 ft)	50	A new hotel complex will be built starting in 2008. Currently, this area is located on Mirae Scientists Street .
Seosan Office Tower	Rason	155 m (509 ft)	40	In the Rason development plan developed after the arrival of Chairman Kim Jong-il from China in May 2010, several 40-story office blocks were designed in the Sason and Dongmyeong areas.
Dongmyeong Office Tower	Rason	155 m (509 ft)	40	In the Rason development plan developed after the arrival of Chairman Kim Jong-il from China in May 2010, several 40-story office blocks were designed in the Sason and Dongmyeong areas.
Pohang Tower 1	Chongjin	138 m (453 ft)	40	It is planned to build the tallest tower complex in North Korea located in Chongjin's residential construction project.
Pohang Tower 2	Chongjin	138 m (453 ft)	40	There are plans to build the tallest tower complex in North Korea, located in a housing project.
Pohang Tower 3	Chongjin	138 m (453 ft)	40	There are plans to build the tallest tower complex in North Korea, located in a housing project.
Pohang Tower 4	Chongjin	138 m (453 ft)	40	There are plans to build the tallest tower complex in North Korea, located in a housing project.

== Timeline of tallest buildings ==
This is a list of the tallest buildings in the North Korea from 1979 to the present.

Years as tallest	Name	Image	Location	Height	Floors	Year	Note
1979–1984	Pyongyang Apartment Tower 1		Pyongyang	105 m (344 ft)	32	1979	The building is located in Seoseong, near the Koryo Hotel.
1979–1984	Pyongyang Apartment Tower 2		Pyongyang	105 m (344 ft)	32	1979	The building is located in Seoseong, near the Koryo Hotel.
1984–1995	Pukmang Tower 1		Wonsan	150 m (490 ft)	32	1984	This building is located in Tongmyeongsan-dong, Wonsan-dong. It is the tallest apartment in Gangwon-do and the tallest apartment in Wonsan City.
1995–2015	Yanggakdo International Hotel		Pyongyang	170 m (560 ft)	47	1995	This hotel is located on an island in the Taedong River in Pyongyang.
2015–2017	Mirae Unha Tower		Pyongyang	210 m (690 ft)	53	2015	It is part of Mirae Scientists Street. It was completed in 2015.
2017–2022	Ryomyong Street Apartment Building 1		Pyongyang	270 m (890 ft)	70	2017	Ryomyong Street in Pyongyang
2022–Present	Songhwa Street Main Tower		Pyongyang	282 m (925 ft)	80	2022	Pyongyang’s Saesallim Street

== See also ==
- Outline of North Korea
