= Kim Il Sung University Educator's Apartment =

Towers in Pyongyang, North Korea

- 김일성종합대학 교육자 아파트 (Korean)
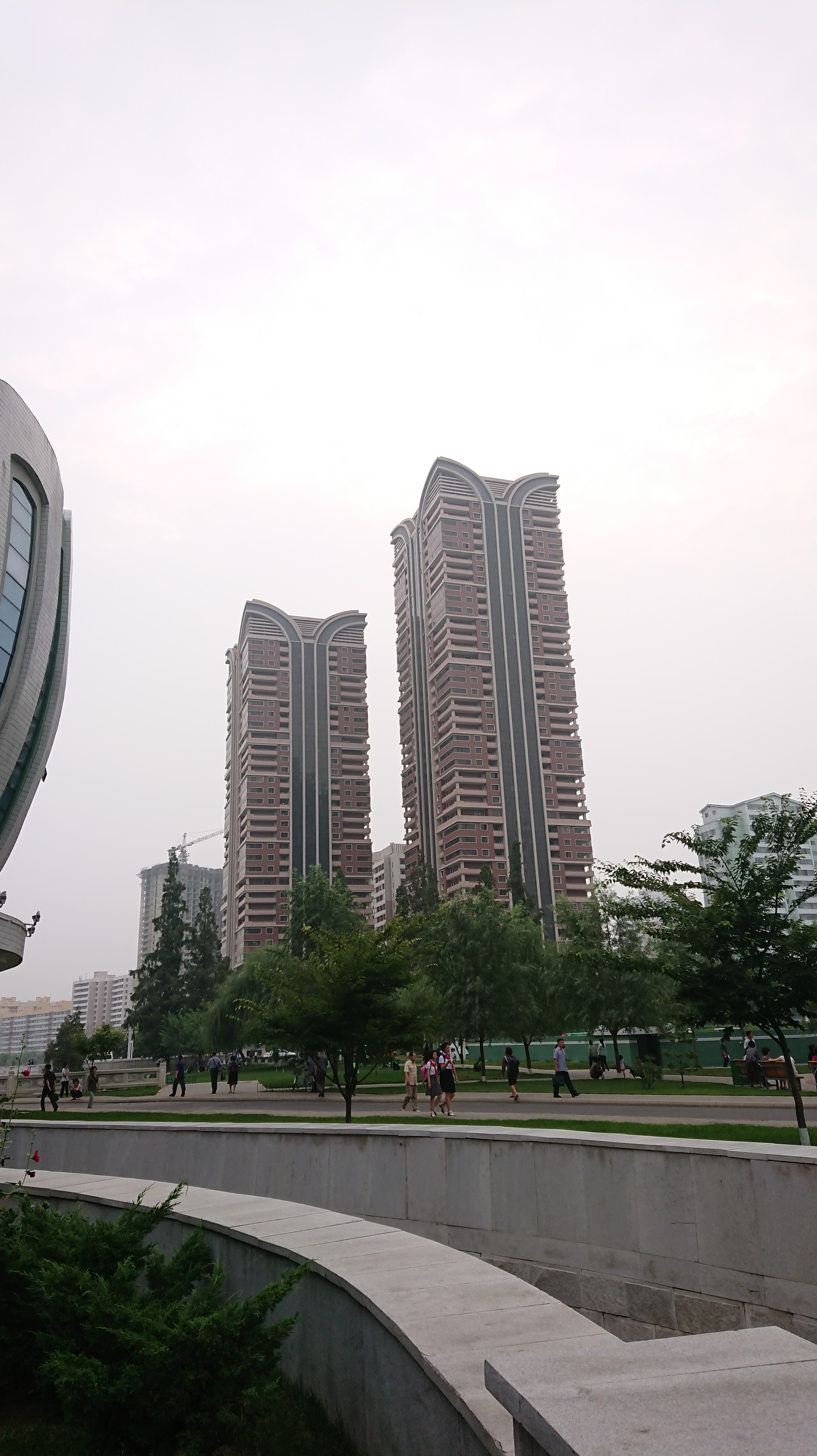
- Interactive map of the Kim Il Sung University Educator's Apartment area

General information
- Status: Completed
- Type: residential
- Architectural style: Postmodernism
- Location: Taesong-guyok, Pyongyang, Pyongyang, North Korea
- Coordinates: 39.0605°N 125.7536°E
- Completed: 2013
- Opened: 2012
- Owner: Kim Il Sung University

Height
- Antenna spire: 153 metres (502 ft) (Tower 1); 132 metres (433 ft) (Tower 2)

Technical details
- Structural system: Concrete
- Floor count: 45 (Tower 1); 37 (Tower 2)
- Floor area: 44,200 m^{2} (476,000 sq ft) (Tower 1); 34,848 m^{2} (375,000 sq ft) (Tower 2)

Other information
- Number of rooms: 300

Website
- Official Website

The Kim Il Sung University Educator's Apartment, (Korean: 김일성종합대학 교육자 아파트) also known as the KISU Residential Towers, are two high-rise residential skyscrapers in Pyongyang, North Korea. Built between 2012 and 2013, Tower One stands at 153 metres (502 ft) tall with 45 floors, while Tower Two stands 132 metres (433 ft) tall with 37. Their official name suggests that their main tenants are the didactic staff of the Kim Il Sung University of Pyongyang.

== History ==
The two towers are part of the North Korean leader Kim Jong Un's so called "new architectural era" which emerged from his personal passion for monumentality and megalomania, from which he had promised better benefits for the fewer members of the studying middle class, and for everyone else, an immersion in a "totalitarian fairytale". Representing a newer postmodernist style of architecture, the towers differentiate from most of the buildings in Pyongyang which mostly resemble the 1970s and 1980s totalitarian architecture style very widespread and common in North Korea.

== See also ==
- List of tallest buildings in North Korea

== Gallery ==
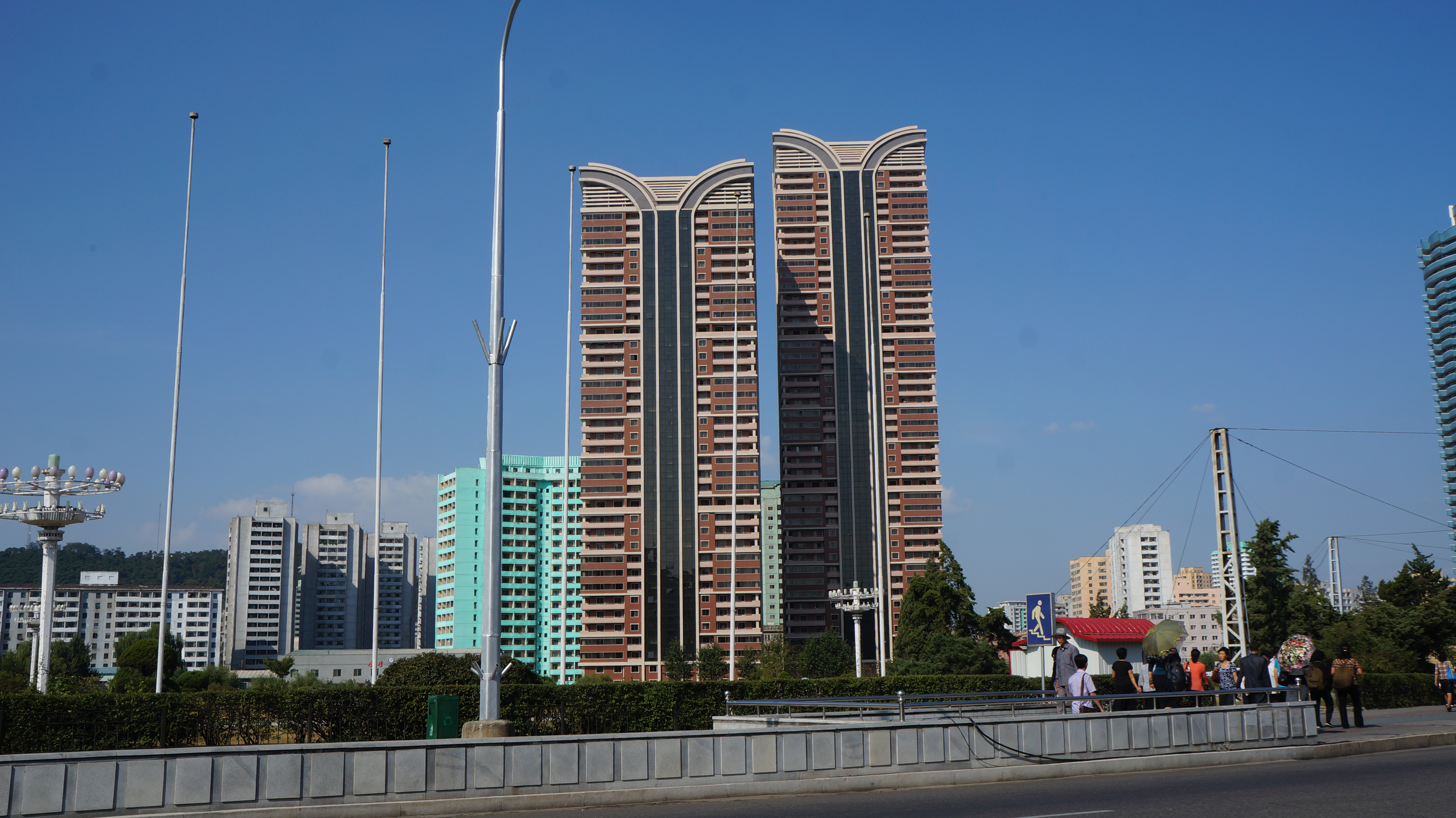
The two buildings in 2014
