= Ryonghung-Dong Apartment =

Tower in Pyongyang, North Korea

- 룡흥동 아파트 (Korean)
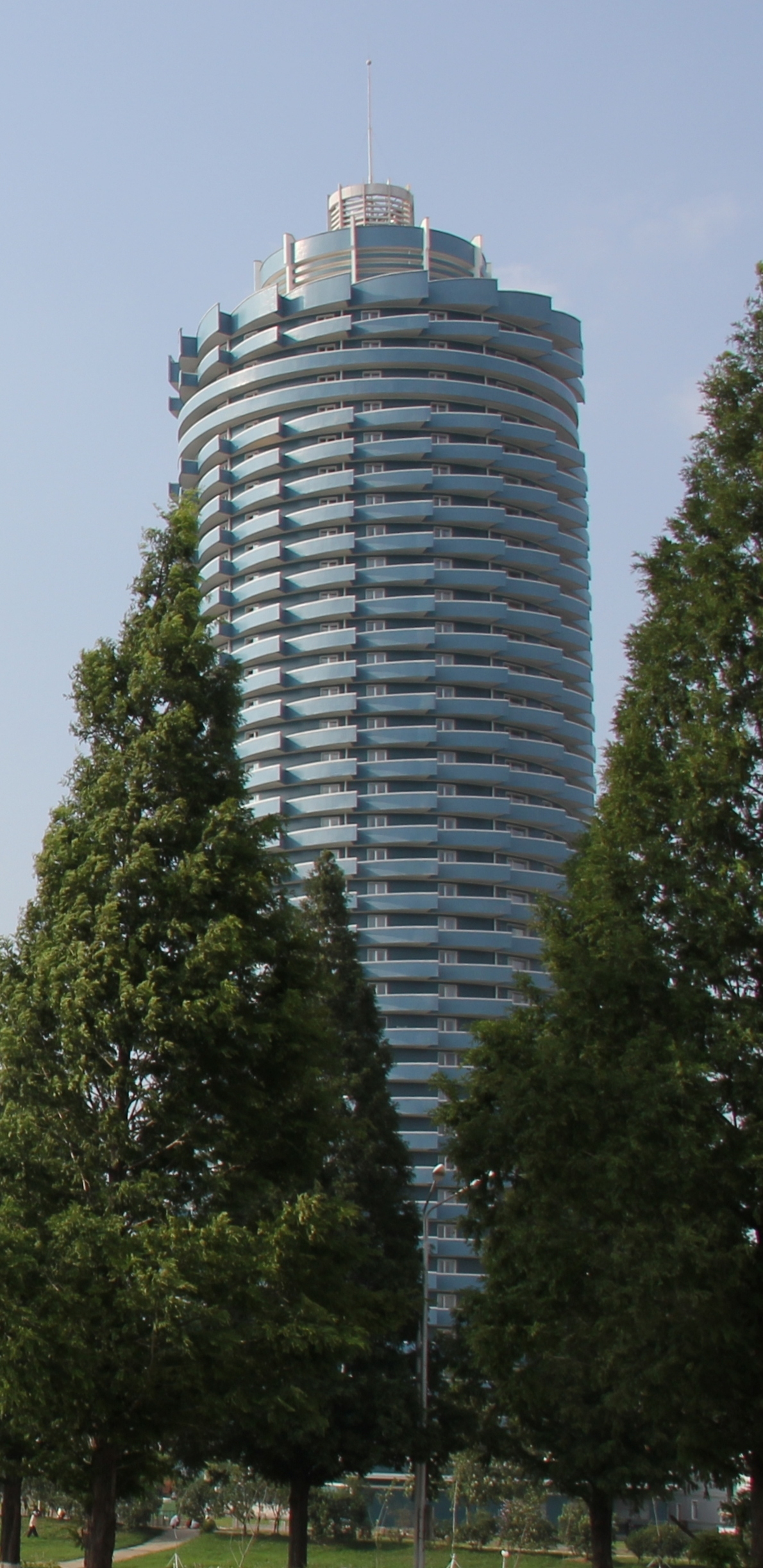
- Interactive map of the Ryonghung-Dong Apartment area

General information
- Status: Completed
- Type: residential
- Location: Taesong-guyok, Pyongyang, Pyongyang, North Korea
- Coordinates: 39.0604°N 125.7556°E
- Completed: 2010

Height
- Antenna spire: 150 metres (490 ft)

Technical details
- Structural system: Concrete
- Floor count: 35

Ryonghung-Dong Apartment (Korean: 룡흥동 아파트) is a high-rise residential skyscraper in Pyongyang, North Korea. Built in 2010, the tower stands at 150 meters (490 ft) tall by antenna spire and is divided into 35 floors. It resembles the 1970s and 1980s totalitarian architecture style very widespread and common in North Korea.

== See also ==
- List of tallest buildings in North Korea
