= Pyongyang KWP Scientists Apartment =

Tower in Pyongyang, North Korea

- 평양조선노동당과학자아파트 (Korean)
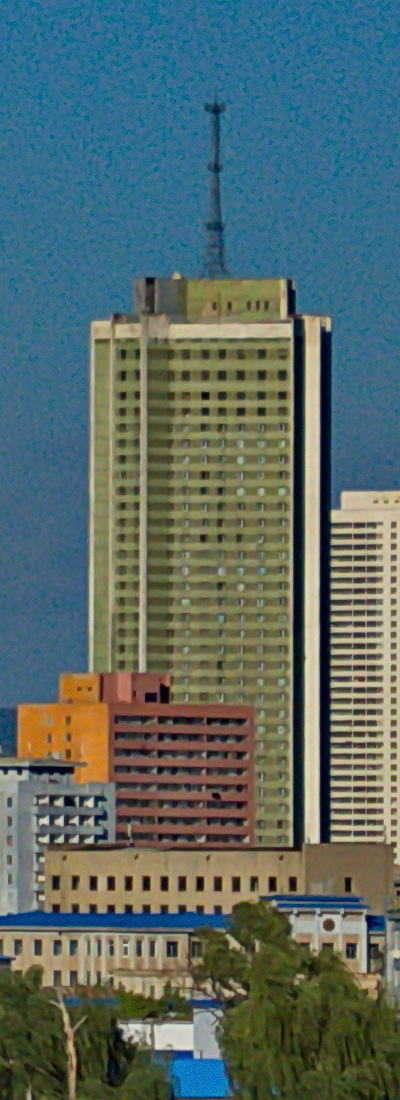
- Interactive map of the Pyongyang KWP Scientists Apartment area

General information
- Status: Completed
- Type: Residential
- Location: Potonggang-guyok, Pyongyang, Pyongyang, North Korea
- Coordinates: 39.0327°N 125.7287°E
- Completed: 1986

Height
- Antenna spire: 150 metres (490 ft)

Technical details
- Structural system: Concrete
- Floor count: 42

Pyongyang KWP Scientists Apartment (Korean: 평양조선노동당과학자아파트) is a high-rise residential skyscraper in Pyongyang, North Korea. Built in 1986, the tower stands at 150 meters (490 ft) tall by antenna spire and is divided into 42 floors. The tower resembles the 1970s and 1980s totalitarian architecture style very widespread and common in North Korea.

== See also ==
- List of tallest buildings in North Korea
