= Kwangbok =

Kwangbok or Kwang-bok (Korean: 광복) may refer to:

- Han Kwang-bok, North Korean politician who served as Vice Premier
- Kwangbok station, Pyongyang, North Korea
- Kwangbok Street, Pyongyang, North Korea
