= Back Seung Woo =

Korean contemporary artist

- Born: 1973 (age 52–53); Daejeon
- Education: Chung Ang University (BA & MA); Middlesex University
- Known for: Photography

Back Seung Woo (born 1973) is a Seoul-based contemporary artist. He received the 2016 Korea Artist Prize. He has shown internationally and is represented by the Misa Shin Gallery.

== Early life and education ==
Back was born in 1973 in Daejeon. He graduated from Chung Ang University with a Master's of Fine Arts in photography in 2002, having previously completed a Bachelor's of Fine Arts in 2000. He completed a Master's of Arts in Fine Art and Theory at Middlesex University in 2005.

== Career ==
Back, who is based in Seoul, refers to himself as a "picturegrapher" rather than a photographer, as he considers photography in the digital age as meaningless because of the proliferation of images. He also sees himself as a "collector of images". His work, Wholeness, has been shown at the National Museum of Modern and Contemporary Art Seoul.

== Collections ==
Back's work is included in the collections of the Museum of Fine Arts, Houston, the Getty Museum, the Museum of Contemporary Photography in Chicago, and the Art Gallery of New South Wales. Back's series in the latter's collection consists of five pieces from the artist's Blow up series, which is part of the Getty's larger holdings. Back created the series as a follow up to his cultural exchange trip to North Korea.

His work from the Utopia series is held in the collection of the Museum of Contemporary Photography, Chicago. The series deals with the architectural propaganda of Pyongyang. These photographs have been called "dystopian landscapes."
