= Pyongyang Secretariat Housing =

Tower in Pyongyang, North Korea

- 평양 사무국 아파트 (Korean)
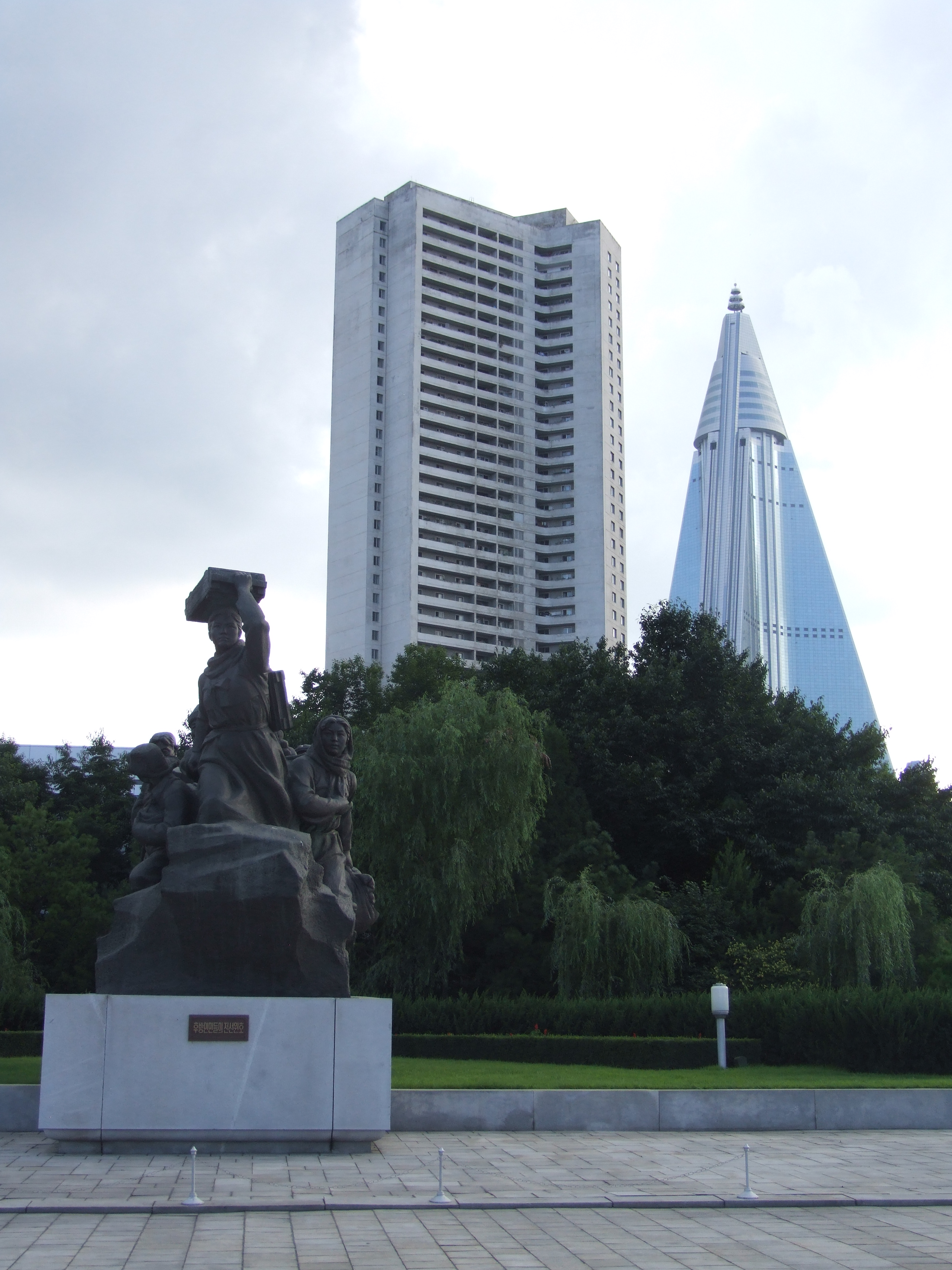
- Interactive map of the Pyongyang Secretariat Housing area

General information
- Status: Completed
- Type: residential
- Location: Potonggang-guyok, Pyongyang, Pyongyang, North Korea
- Coordinates: 39.0381°N 125.7367°E
- Completed: 1987

Height
- Height: 133.2 metres (437 ft)

Technical details
- Structural system: Concrete
- Floor count: 40

The Pyongyang Secretariat Housing (Korean: 평양 사무국 아파트) is a high-rise residential skyscraper in Pyongyang, North Korea. Built in 1987, the tower stands at 133.2 meters (437 ft) tall and is divided into 40 floors. The tower resembles the 1970s and 1980s totalitarian architecture style very widespread and common in North Korea.

== See also ==
- List of tallest buildings in North Korea
