= Ryomyong New Town =

Town in Pyongyang, North Korea

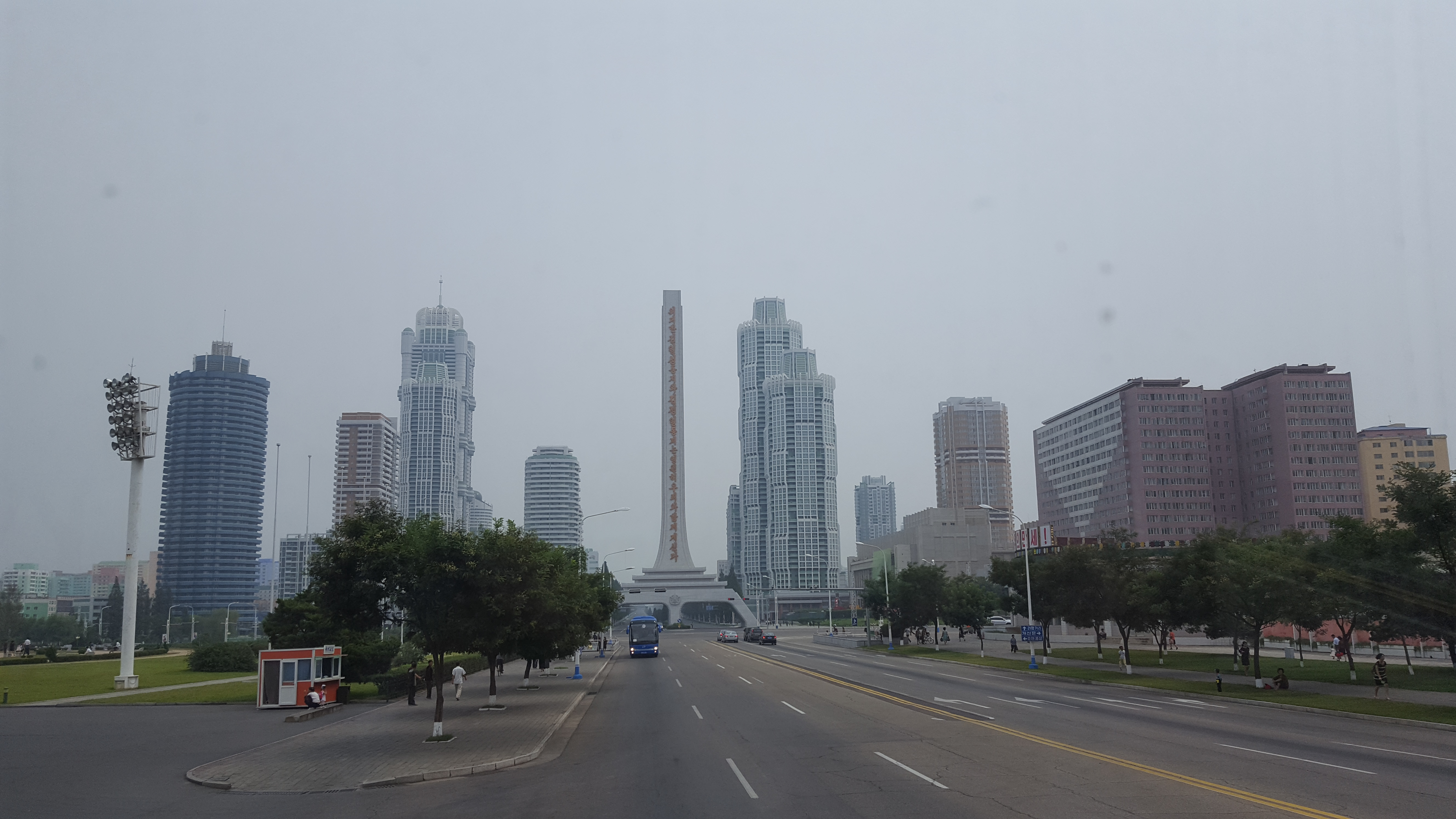

Korean name
- Chosŏn'gŭl: 려명거리신도시
- Hancha: 黎明거리新都市
- Revised Romanization: Ryeomyeong-geori sindosi
- McCune–Reischauer: Ryŏmyŏng-gŏri sintosi

Ryomyong New Town (Korean: 려명거리신도시) refers to a new town located in Pyongyang, North Korea. The exact location is Ryomyong Avenue which refers from Yongsaengtap to Kumsusan Palace of the Sun in Taesong-guyok.

== Name ==
The name "Ryomyong" means "dawn" in Korean language.

== Project ==
The project was proposed by Kim Jong Un in March 2016 and the planned completion was in August of the same year. There were several outdated buildings in Ryomyong Avenue, but due to the plan, all of them were demolished. Construction was started in March 2016.

It consists of 40 new condominiums, 33 refurbished condominiums and 34 of public facilities including 6 schools, 3 kindergartens and 3 nurseries. Also, 7 buildings for Kim Il Sung University will be built and 15 commercial buildings will be constructed. Around the Kumsusan Palace of the Sun, only small and idyllic buildings will be built due to the height restrictions. The motto is 'Green city, energy-saving city'. All apartments have passive solar heating systems, geothermal systems and solar panels.

The construction was started in March 2016 and topped-out in August of the same year. Total 1.7 billion won were used and the total areas are 151500 m^{2}.

=== Ryomyong Condominium ===
This condominium has 82 stories, with a height of 270 m. Construction was started in March 2016 but was temporarily on-hold due to redirection of construction to flooding in North Hamgyong province. It was restarted and was estimated to complete on 15 April 2017.

The condominium is de facto the highest building of North Korea, since Ryugyong Hotel (de jure the highest building) was topped-out in 1989 and has yet to open.

Construction was completed by 13 April 2017 and officially opened just after 2 days.

== Criticism ==
=== Poor construction ===
Construction has been described as rushed, with 270m of condominium built in just 74 days. This is quite short compared to other well-known skyscrapers such as Petronas Twin Tower (4~5 years) and Burj Khalifa (5 years). A South Korean expert said, "To build 270m of skyscraper, construction should be done for at least 2 years or more."

Another 23-story apartment building in Pyongchon-guyok, constructed in a similar manner, collapsed around May 18, 2014. The cause of the collapse has been officially declared by North's official Korean Central News Agency as "irresponsible supervision and control".

== Relation to other building projects ==
The new town is one of a number of "monumental" projects built between 2012-2017, including the Pyongyang Sci-Tech Complex, new Natural History Museum, new People's Open-air Ice Rink, Changjon Street (창전거리), Unha Scientists Street, Wisong Scientists Street (위성과학자거리), Mirae Street and Ryomyong Street.
