= Mansudae Apartments =

Towers in Pyongyang, North Korea

- 만수대 아파트 (Korean)
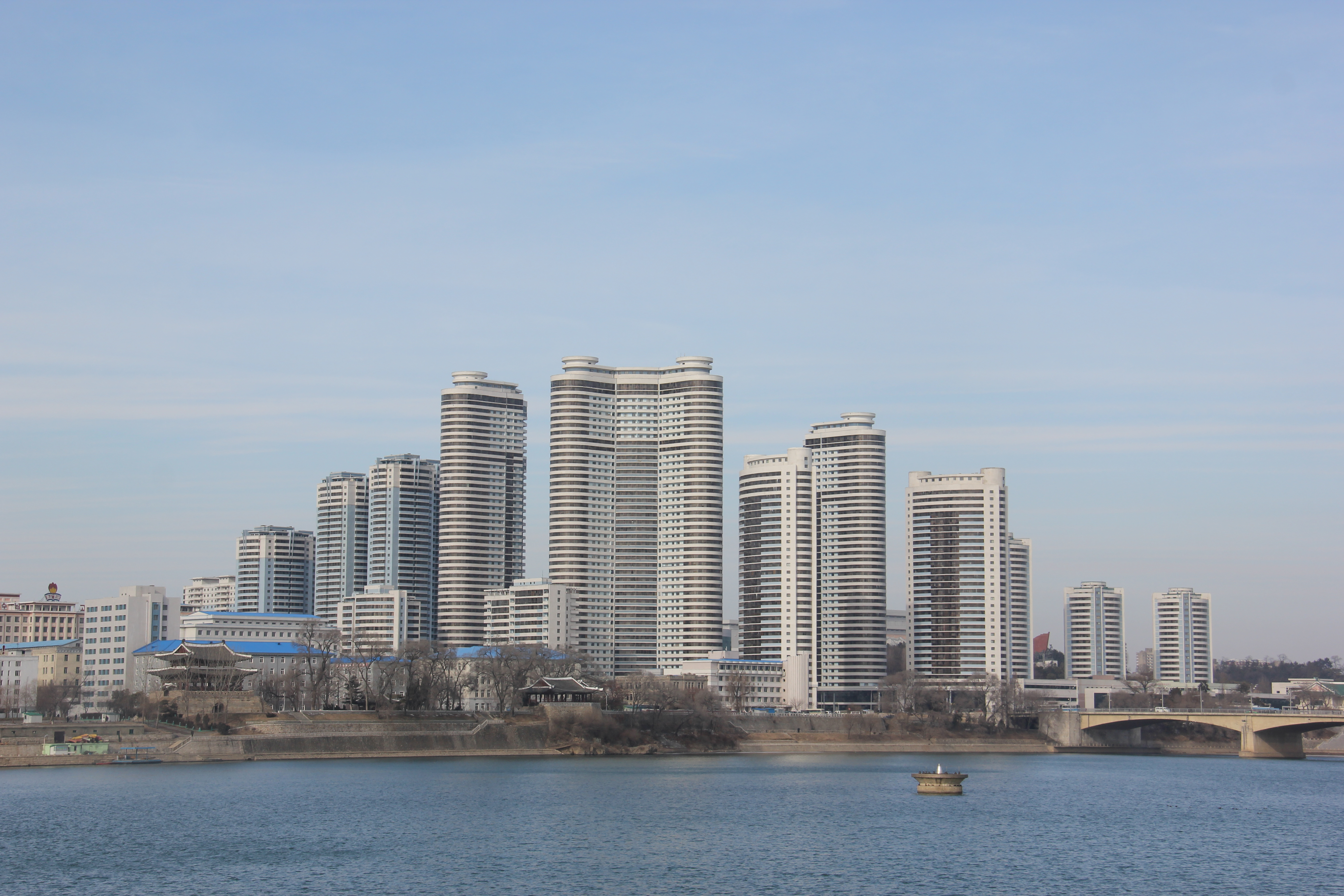
- Interactive map of the Mansudae Apartments area

General information
- Status: Completed
- Type: Residential
- Location: Chung-guyok, Pyongyang, Pyongyang, North Korea
- Coordinates: 39.0258°N 125.7544°E
- Groundbreaking: July 2008
- Construction started: 2011
- Completed: April 15, 2012

Height
- Height: 146 metres (479 ft) (Building 1 and 2)

Technical details
- Structural system: Concrete
- Floor count: 15–45

The Mansudae Apartments (Korean: 만수대 아파트) is a 17-building high-rise residential complex in Pyongyang, North Korea, inaugurated on April 15, 2012. Buildings 1 and 2 are the tallest in the hierarchy of the complex, standing at 146 metres (480 ft) tall each, both being divided into 45 floors.

== History ==
The complex was part of a bigger housing project which spread over the entire Mansudae Street in Pyongyang. The groundbreaking took place in July 2008. The structural work of each building started in late 2011 and was completed only 87 days later on April 15, 2012, when the entire complex was inaugurated specially for Day of the Sun which represented Kim Il Sung's 100th birthday.

The complex only hosts apartments for the higher social classes of the regime. The apartments were reportedly distributed to other people as well by the government on black market due to the value of the home transactions falling by as high as 85 percent at the end of 2013.

The complex shares the same urbanistic principles from the late 1970s soviet era. In order to maintain standardization while maximizing diversity, architects begun to develop some compromises that combine urban planning and economic convenience. The buildings resembles the totalitarian architecture style very widespread and common in North Korea with a touch of postmodernism.

=== Buildings ===
| Name | Image | Height m (ft) | Floors | Ref. |
|---|---|---|---|---|
| Building 1 | | 146 m (479 ft) | 45 | |
| Building 2 | | 146 m (479 ft) | 45 | |
| Building 3 | | 130 m (430 ft) | 40 | |
| Building 8A | | 107 m (351 ft) | 35 | |
| Building 8B | | 107 m (351 ft) | 35 | |
| Building 4 | | 104 m (341 ft) | 32 | |
| Building 5 | | 104 m (341 ft) | 32 | |
| Building 9A | | 101 m (331 ft) | 33 | |
| Building 9B | | 101 m (331 ft) | 33 | |
| Building 10A | | 77 m (253 ft) | 25 | |
| Building 10B | | 77 m (253 ft) | 25 | |
| Building 12 | | 77 m (253 ft) | 25 | |
| Building 11 | | 62 m (203 ft) | 20 | |
| Building 13 | | 62 m (203 ft) | 20 | |
| Building 14 | | 62 m (203 ft) | 20 | |
| Building 6 | | 47 m (154 ft) | 15 | |
| Building 7 | | 47 m (154 ft) | 15 | |

== See also ==
- List of tallest buildings in North Korea
