= Kwangbok Street 1 =

Tower in Pyongyang, North Korea

- 광복길 1 (Korean)
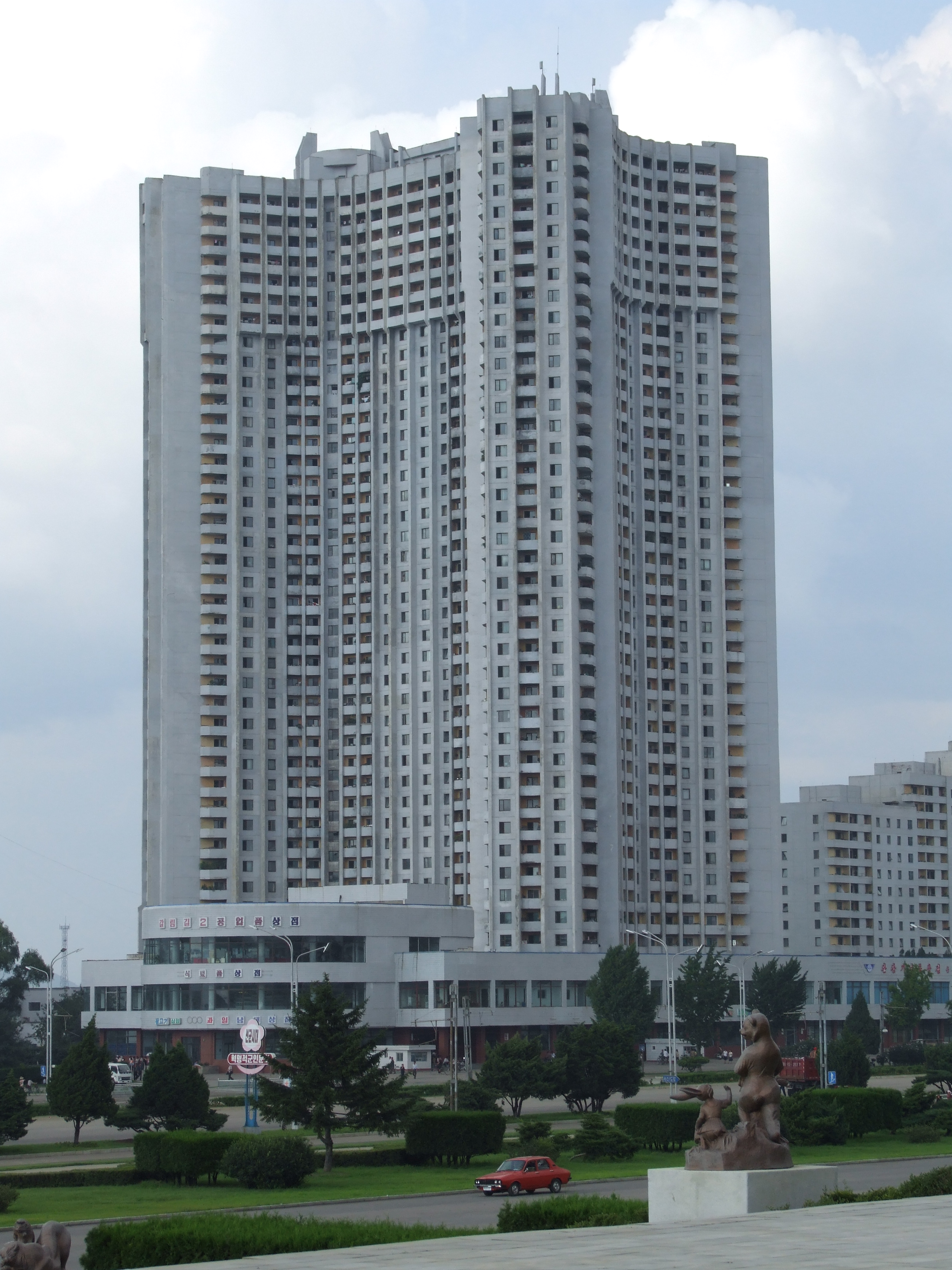
- Interactive map of the Kwangbok Street 1 area

General information
- Status: Completed
- Type: residential
- Location: Mangyongdae-guyok, Pyongyang, Pyongyang, North Korea
- Coordinates: 39.0346°N 125.6932°E
- Completed: 1989

Height
- Antenna spire: 144.3 metres (473 ft)

Technical details
- Structural system: Concrete
- Floor count: 42

Kwangbok Street 1 (Korean: 광복길 1) is a high-rise residential skyscraper in Pyongyang, North Korea. Built in 1989 within the "Kwangbok Street Apartments" project, the tower stands at 144 m (472 ft) tall and is divided into 42 floors. The tower resembles the 1970s and 1980s totalitarian architecture style very widespread and common in North Korea.

== Architecture ==
=== Concept ===
Transforming the construction of Changgwang street beginning with the 1980s, high-rise apartment buildings, cultural and welfare facilities were built and equipped with all necessary facilities and free of charge. Following this was the construction of other streets in Pyongyang such as Kwangbok and Thongil, where more than a million households claimed to have been constructed by the North Korean Government. The Kwangbok Street Apartments were designed as a building complex set to project an image of a modern, forward-thinking society. These were designed for the bourgeoisie, as they stand alongside a green-spaced main boulevard with cylindrical or irregularly shaped rectangles volumetries with balconies made in bands that double as verandas.

The Kwangbok Street 1 is part of the "Kwangbok Street Apartments" project which was built alongside the 4,4 km long Kwangbok Boulevard for the 13th World Festival of Youth and Students from 1989, and was meant to host households for the political elite of Pyongyang.

== See also ==
- List of tallest buildings in North Korea
