= ATRIUM =

ATRIUM (acronym for Architecture of Totalitarian Regimes of the 20th century In Europe's Urban Memory) is a Cultural Route of the Council of Europe dedicated to the architecture and urban memory of the authoritarian and totalitarian regimes of 20th-century Europe. The Route is managed by the eponymous transnational association, based in Forlì, and was certified as a Cultural Route by the Council of Europe in 2014 and subsequently re-confirmed in 2018 and 2022.

== Name and acronym ==
The name ATRIUM is an acronym for Architecture of Totalitarian Regimes of the 20th century In Europe's Urban Memory. The Route focuses on architectural, urban, documentary and intangible heritage associated with the dictatorial and totalitarian regimes of the 20th century, including buildings and urban spaces associated with fascist regimes and their occupations, as well as those developed under the communist regimes of Central, Eastern and South-Eastern Europe.

== The project ==
ATRIUM originated as a European territorial cooperation project carried out between 2011 and 2013 under the South East Europe Programme 2007–2013, with the Municipality of Forlì as lead partner. The partnership consisted of 18 bodies and institutions from 11 countries: Italy, Slovenia, Bulgaria, Hungary, Slovakia, Romania, Greece, Croatia, Serbia, Albania and Bosnia and Herzegovina.

The project aimed to study and promote the architectural and urban heritage left by the non-democratic regimes of the 20th century, analysing their original functions, architectural and urban characteristics, political and social implications, and relationship with collective memory. Its outputs included a transnational survey of case studies, tools for the management and adaptive reuse of the heritage, and the preparation of the dossier that led to the recognition of the Route by the Council of Europe.

During the project, numerous architectural and urban complexes were analysed, including public buildings, squares, educational and sporting facilities, industrial settlements, planned towns, infrastructure and commemorative monuments. The project's documentation identified 71 buildings, sites, cityscapes and monuments across the participating countries.

== The Association and the Cultural Route ==
The ATRIUM Association was founded in June 2013 to manage the future European Cultural Route. According to the association's official timeline, the nine founding members were the Italian municipalities of Forlì, Predappio, Forlimpopoli, Bertinoro and Cesenatico, the Bulgarian Municipality of Dimitrovgrad, the Bosnian Municipality of Doboj, the County of Iași in Romania and the Town of Labin in Croatia.

The ATRIUM Route was certified by the Council of Europe in 2014 and re-confirmed during the 2018 and 2022 evaluation cycles. Its objectives include the preservation and promotion of tangible and intangible 20th-century heritage, scientific research, cooperation between public bodies and universities, education on history and memory, and the development of forms of cultural tourism aimed at the critical interpretation of so-called dissonant heritage.

== Current network ==
As of September 2026, the official ATRIUM website lists the following territorial members, in addition to the University of Crete: Ancona, Benetússer, Bertinoro and Fratta Terme, Carbonia, Castrocaro Terme e Terra del Sole, Cervia, Cesena, Cesenatico, Dimitrovgrad in Bulgaria, Dimitrovgrad in Serbia, Forlì, Forlimpopoli, Iași, Kraków, including the district of Nowa Huta, Labin, Leros, Massa Marittima, Merano, Përmet, Predappio, Raša, Ştei, Torviscosa and Tresignana.

The current network includes localities in Albania, Bulgaria, Croatia, Greece, Italy, Poland, Romania, Serbia and Spain. The Council of Europe describes the Route as connecting heritage deriving from different authoritarian and totalitarian experiences of the 20th century in Western, Southern and Eastern Europe.

== Examples of sites and monuments ==
The following list comprises the principal sites currently presented in the official ATRIUM catalogue. The network includes buildings, architectural complexes, squares, urban axes, settlements and other elements of 20th-century heritage.

=== Albania ===
==== Përmet ====
- Përmet Congress Building
- Former Officers' Residence, now the "Odhise Paskali" Multifunctional Cultural Centre

=== Bulgaria ===
==== Dimitrovgrad ====
- Town centre
- Bulgaria Boulevard
- Poetry Square
- Town Hall
- Maritsa Park

=== Croatia ===
==== Labin ====
- Podlabin residential settlement
- Main Square and Littorio Tower
- Pijacal

==== Raša ====
- Main Square
- Residential complexes
- Former power station

=== Greece ===
==== Kalymnos ====
- Government Palace

==== Kos ====
- Government Palace
- Primary School
- Former Casa del Fascio

==== Lakki ====
- Former Italian town hall
- Church of Agios Nikolaos, formerly the Catholic Church of Saint Francis
- Market hall
- Palazzina Comando
- School complex
- Cinema-theatre building
- Former Albergo Roma

==== Rhodes ====
- Central Market
- Bank of Italy, now Bank of Greece
- Courthouse and Tribunal
- Government Palace
- G. Puccini Theatre
- Aquarium
- Albergo delle Rose, now Rhodes Casino

=== Italy ===
==== Ancona ====
- Passetto War Memorial
- Viale della Vittoria
- Stadio Dorico
- Palazzo del Popolo, formerly Palazzo del Littorio
- Palazzo delle Poste e Telegrafi
- Casa del Mutilato

==== Bertinoro and Fratta Terme ====
- Grand Hotel Terme della Fratta, formerly Terme INFPS
- Former Casa del Fascio

==== Carbonia ====
- Piazza Roma
- Theatre
- Former Littorio Tower
- Former Opera Nazionale Dopolavoro building
- Housing and complex of the Grande Miniera di Serbariu

==== Castrocaro Terme ====
- Festival Pavilion
- Grand Hotel
- Thermal Palace
- Town Hall

==== Cervia and Milano Marittima ====
- Grand Hotel Cervia
- Former Villa Perelli
- Former Varese summer camp
- Former Montecatini summer camp

==== Cesena ====
- Former air-raid shelter
- Former GIL building
- Former OND building
- Social housing complex on Via Matteotti

==== Cesenatico ====
- Grand Hotel
- AGIP summer camp
- Former Casa del Fascio, now the municipal library

==== Forlì ====
- Viale della Libertà, formerly Viale Mussolini
- War Memorial
- Former GIL building
- Former Aeronautical College
- Former Santarelli nursery school
- Post Office building
- Former Casa del Mutilato
- Vecchiazzano sanatorium complex
- Former SITA/ATR plant

==== Forlimpopoli ====
- Former GIL building
- Former teacher-training institute
- Former pumping station of the Spinadello aqueduct

==== Massa Marittima and Niccioleta ====
- Church of Santa Barbara
- Former Dopolavoro

==== Merano ====
- Former Casa Littoria, now former Casa del Fascio
- Maia Hippodrome
- Town Hall

==== Predappio ====
- Casa del Fascio e dell'Ospitalità
- Palazzo Varano
- Caproni Aeronautica plant
- Primary school
- Former ONB/GIL building
- Church of Sant'Antonio
- Santa Rosa nursery school and oratory

==== Torviscosa ====
- Town Hall and Piazza Impero
- Littorio Towers
- SNIA Viscosa industrial complex

==== Tresigallo ====
- Former CEL.NA plant
- Former GIL building
- Former Casa del Fascio
- Church of Sant'Apollinare and portico
- Piazza della Repubblica
- Piazzale Forlanini

=== Poland ===
==== Nowa Huta ====
- Central Square
- Post Office Square
- Adamski Blocks
- Administrative Centre of the steelworks
- Former Świt Cinema
- Ludowy Theatre
- Swedish Block
- Music School
- Centrum post-modern complexes

=== Romania ===
==== Iași ====
- Piața Unirii
- Student Cultural Centre
- Prefecture
- Luceafărul Theatre

==== Ştei ====
- Fountain
- Administrative Palace
- Cultural Centre
- Sports complex
- Wooden manor houses

=== Serbia ===
==== Dimitrovgrad ====
- Former Svoboda textile factory
- Cultural Centre
- Primary school
- Municipal building
- Community centre

=== Spain ===
==== Benetússer ====
- Former San José rice mill, also known as Meivel

== Recent developments ==
The ATRIUM network has continued to expand since its certification in 2014. In September 2025, the Municipality of Benetússer joined the Route, becoming the first Spanish municipality to do so.

In May 2026, the official accession of Ancona to the Route was announced. The first sites identified for the local route were the Passetto War Memorial, Viale della Vittoria, Stadio Dorico, the Post Office building, Palazzo del Popolo and the Casa del Mutilato.

The Association has also developed educational activities, research initiatives, cultural tourism projects and European projects concerning the adaptive reuse of dissonant heritage. Recent activities have included initiatives for schools, work on the memory of colonial heritage, and ATRIUM's participation in European networks of cultural routes.

== See also ==
- Totalitarian architecture
- Fascist architecture
- Stalinist architecture
