= Pyongyang Information Center =

Tower in Pyongyang, North Korea

- 평양정보센터 (Korean)
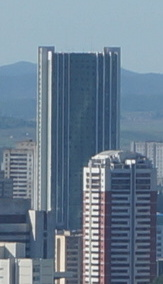

General information
- Status: Completed
- Type: Office
- Location: Potonggang-guyok, Pyongyang, Pyongyang, North Korea
- Coordinates: 39.0357°N 125.7276°E
- Completed: 1986

Height
- Height: 139.9 metres (459 ft)

Technical details
- Structural system: Concrete
- Floor count: 42

The Pyongyang Information Center (Korean: 평양정보센터) is a high-rise office skyscraper in Pyongyang, North Korea. Built in 1986, the tower stands at 139.9 meters (459 ft) tall and is divided into 42 floors. It is situated in the proximity of the Pothong River and the Ryugyong Hotel. The building represented the headquarters of the Pyongyang Information Center (PIC), a vital computer-based management center in North Korea and the home to software development center for Korea Computer Center (KCC).

== See also ==
- List of tallest buildings in North Korea

== Gallery ==
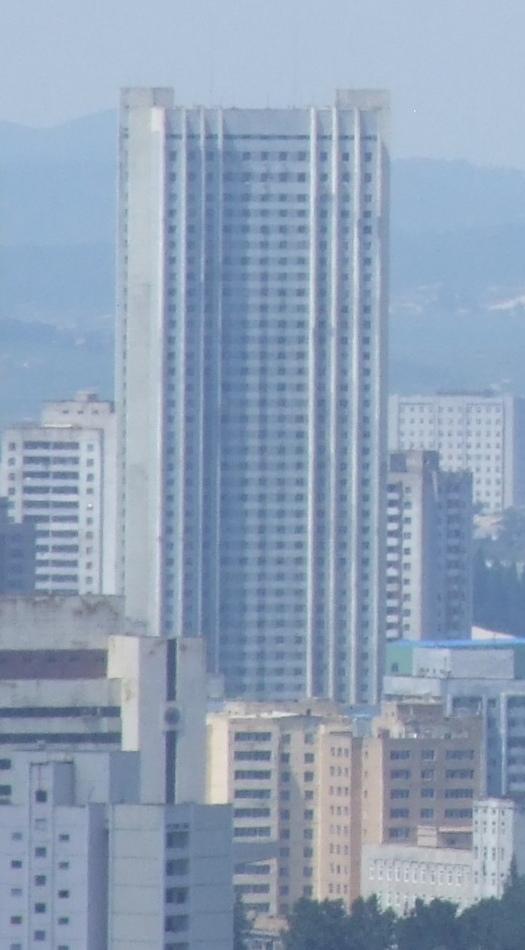
The building seen from the Yanggakdo International Hotel
