= Songhwa Street Main Tower =

Tower in Pyongyang, North Korea

- 송화거리 메인 타워 (Korean)
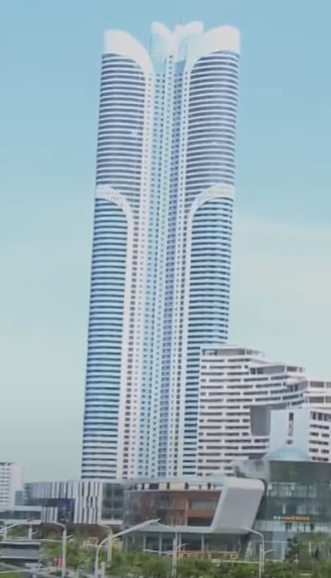

General information
- Status: Completed
- Type: Residential
- Architectural style: postmodern
- Location: Sadong-guyok, Pyongyang, Pyongyang, North Korea
- Coordinates: 38.9995°N 125.8007°E

Height
- Height: 984 feet (300 m) (Note: With no official sources to depict the exact height of the tower, most of the skyscraper databases estimate its height based on a count of 80 floors.)
- Antenna spire: 984 feet (300 m)

Technical details
- Floor count: 80

Songhwa Street Main Tower (Korean: 송화거리 메인 타워) is a residential skyscraper, part of the Songhwa Street residential complex in Pyongyang. Completed in 2022, the tower stands at a height of 984 feet (300 m) with 80 floors, and is the tallest residential building in North Korea and second tallest building in the country.

== History ==
=== Concept ===
The tower was built as part of the "Songhwa Street Residential Complex", located in the Sadong-guyok district as part of a grand plan to construct 10,000 modern flats in Pyongyang every year during the five-year plan for national economic development. It is the first edge city created in the eastern part of the capital. According to the official Korean Central News Agency (KCNA), the complex project also aimed to provide the newly constructed neighbourhood with "public catering facilities" as a resolution of building a total of 50,000 apartments in Pyongyang by 2025, with 10,000 units each year.
