= Mirae Unha Tower =

Tower in Pyongyang, North Korea

Unha Tower
- 은하 타워 (Korean)
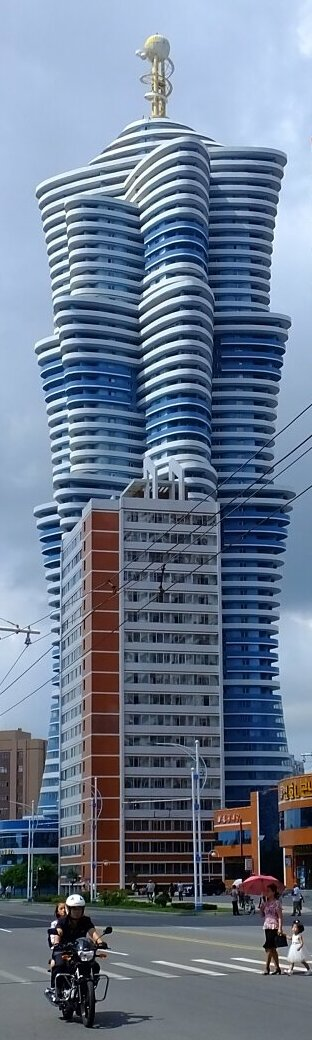
- Interactive map of the Unha Tower area

General information
- Status: Completed
- Architectural style: Futurism
- Location: Mirae Scientists Street, Pyongyang, North Korea
- Coordinates: 38.9937°N 125.7304°E

Height
- Height: 210 m (690 ft)

Technical details
- Floor count: 53

The Unha Tower, also referred to as the Galaxy Tower, is a futuristic 53-story building in Pyongyang, North Korea. It was built as part of the redevelopment of Mirae Scientists Street and is the tallest tower on the street.

== History ==
In September 2014, the government of North Korea announced an initiative to develop a housing estate in what is now Mirae Scientists Street along the Taedong River. The apartments were to be assigned to engineers and scientists. The Mirae Unha Tower was the tallest apartment planned in the redevelopment, standing at 53-stories tall. Construction began in early 2015, and the tower was opened in November the same year. At its completion, it was the 71st tallest building in the world.

Construction entailed heavy manual labour and outdated building techniques involving pouring concrete onto steel, with no I-beams used to build the tower. As there are no reports of Kim Jong-un entering the building, it is possible the tower was internally incomplete. The state-run Korean Central News Agency claims that the tower was completed in "little more than 60 days", while Naenara states it was designed to resemble the orbital path of an electron around an atom. The tower has also been described as shaped like a "blossoming flower".

In May 2017, the South Korean-based NK News reported that the tower was decaying and had remained uninhabited since its opening, though shops on the ground floor appear to be operational. Researcher Curtis Melvin says that analysis of photos of the building shows no domestic furnishings in balconies unlike other Pyongyang apartments. In April 2025, the tower was reported to be developing cracks, with the exterior walls corroding, causing residents to worry about a collapse.

== Gallery ==
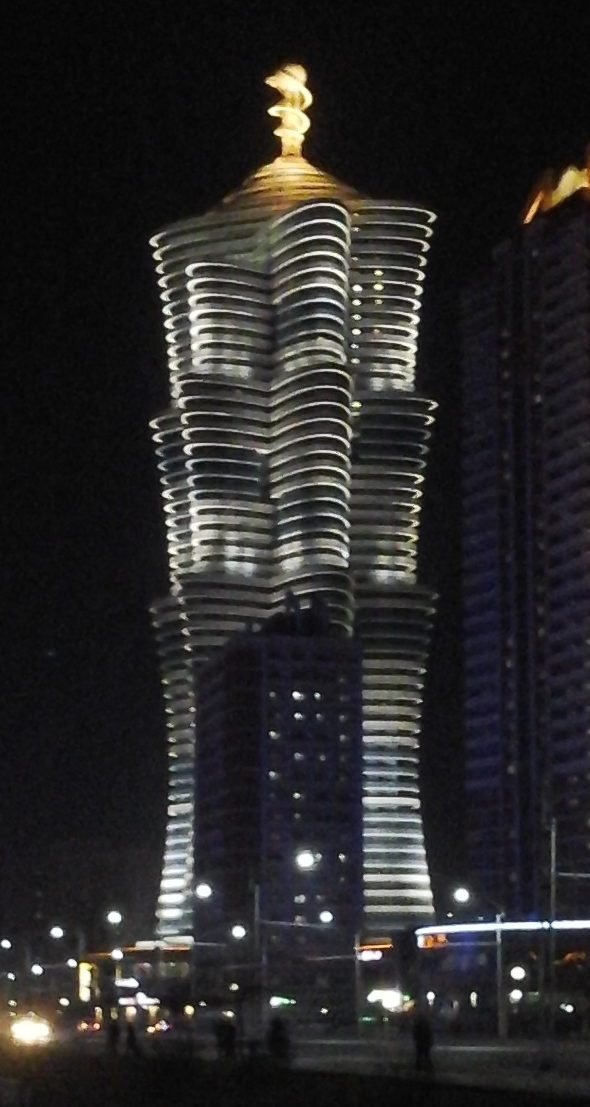
Tower lit up at night

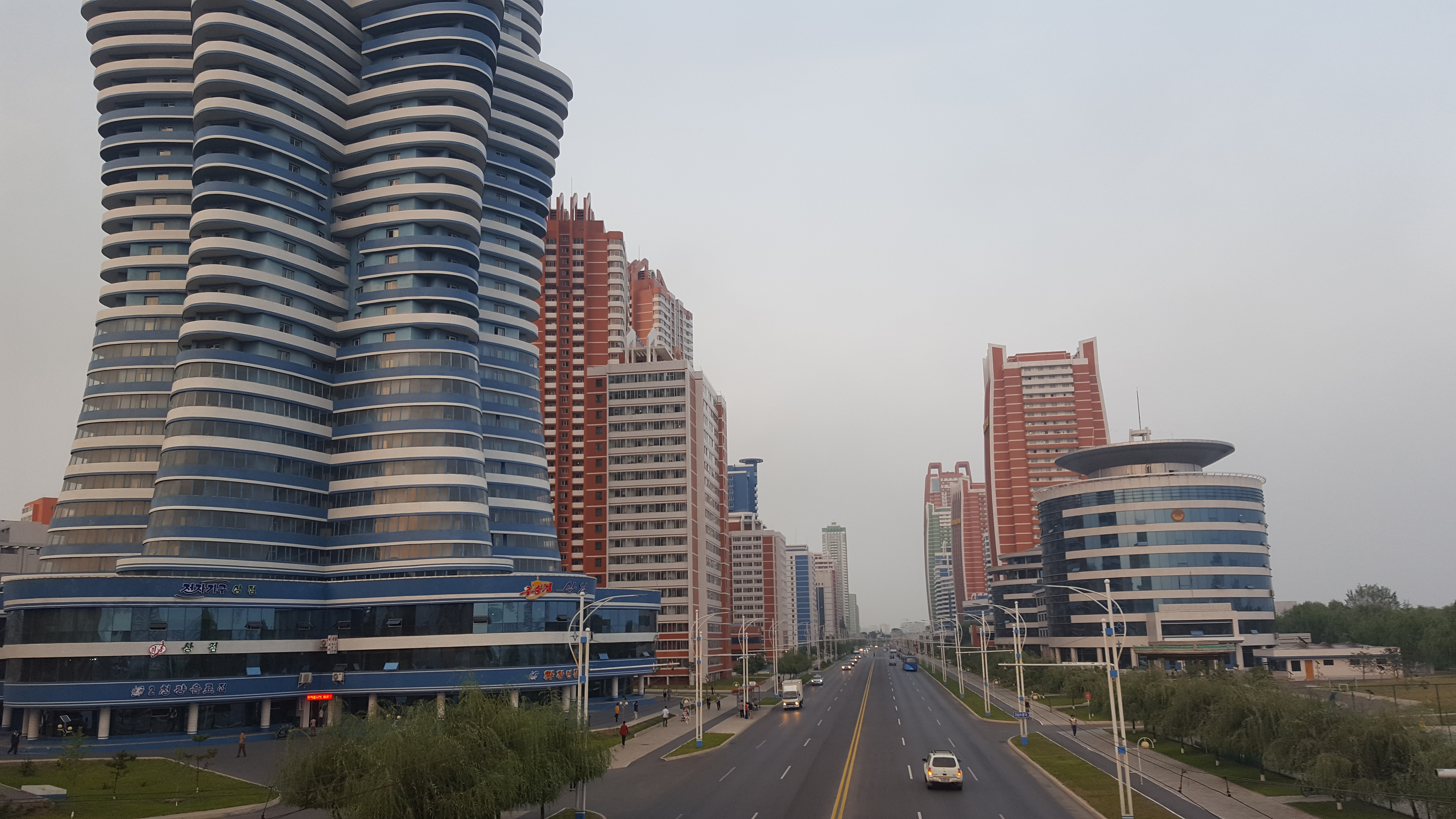
Tower at ground level

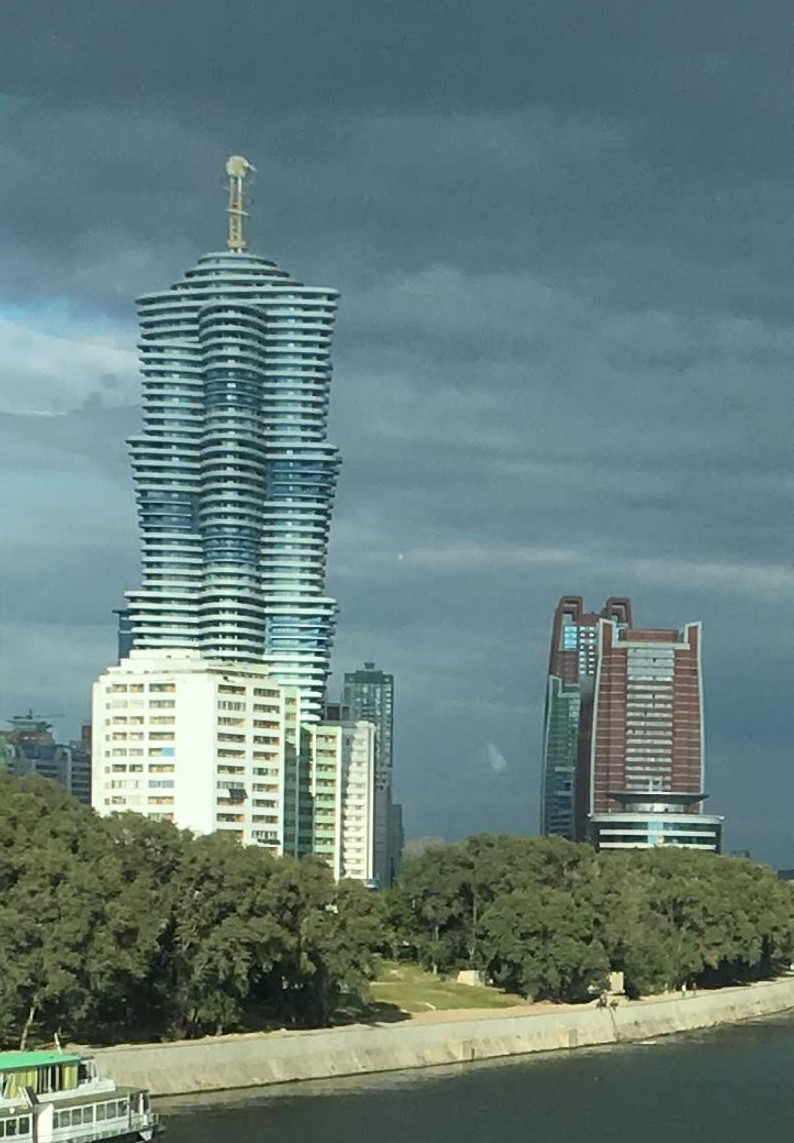
Tower from across the Taedong River

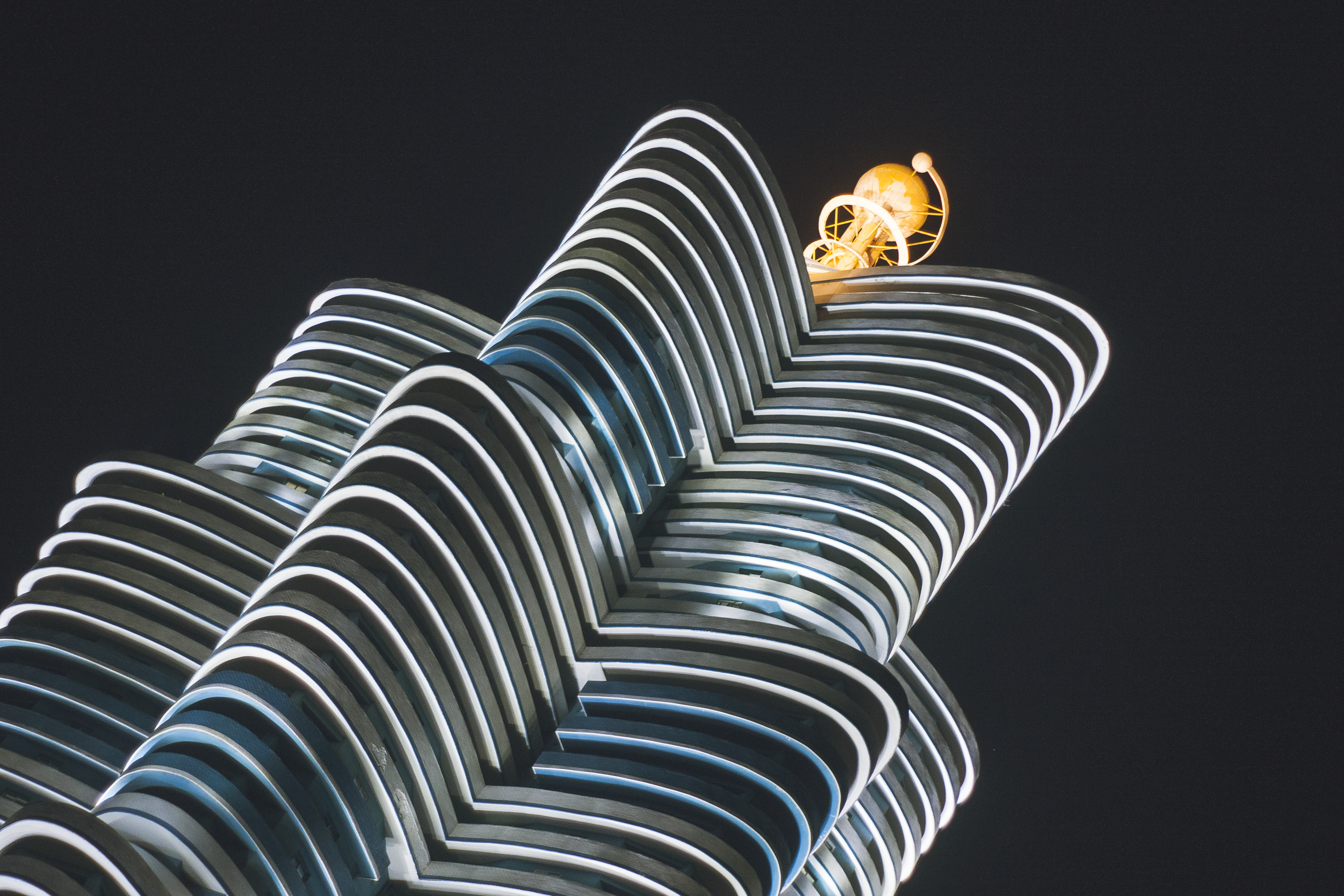
Closeup of the finial
