= Architectural propaganda =

Architecture as a form of propaganda

Architectural propaganda is the use of architecture for the purpose of propaganda. Throughout history, significant architectural works have been used to convey ideas, including many intended to command respect and obedience.

== Common themes ==
Architect Richard Buday has contended that architectural works have been used to justify loyalty to an area's rulers, or to religious and spiritual figures. Buday suggests that "the Sphinx and the pyramids were outsized visual demands for respect and obedience to Pharaoh. The Parthenon was constructed for societal manipulation, as well as to honor a goddess (the temple's ornamentation reminded Athenians that their beating back of a Persian invasion was an act of divine intervention). Roman triumphal arches were self-aggrandizing demonstrations of rulers' might and superiority". Later in history, Buday writes that various leaders have invoked particular architectural styles to invoke connections with previous historical states and ideas which are associated with them, such as using ancient Greek and Roman imagery to convey the idea of democracy, or invoking similar classical architecture to denote imperial ambitions.

In modern times, architecture is used to attract tourism.

== Examples ==
=== China ===
Journalist Joshua Kurlantzick writes that China has been engaging in a "charm offensive" in the 21st century to improve relations with many other countries, especially in the developing world. Kurlantzick contends that the Chinese government has leveraged the construction of large works of architecture abroad to better its standing with these countries. He also criticizes many of these projects, such as large-sized buildings and government ministries, as white-elephant projects. Kurlantzick cites examples of Chinese-led construction in Mozambique and East Timor as examples.

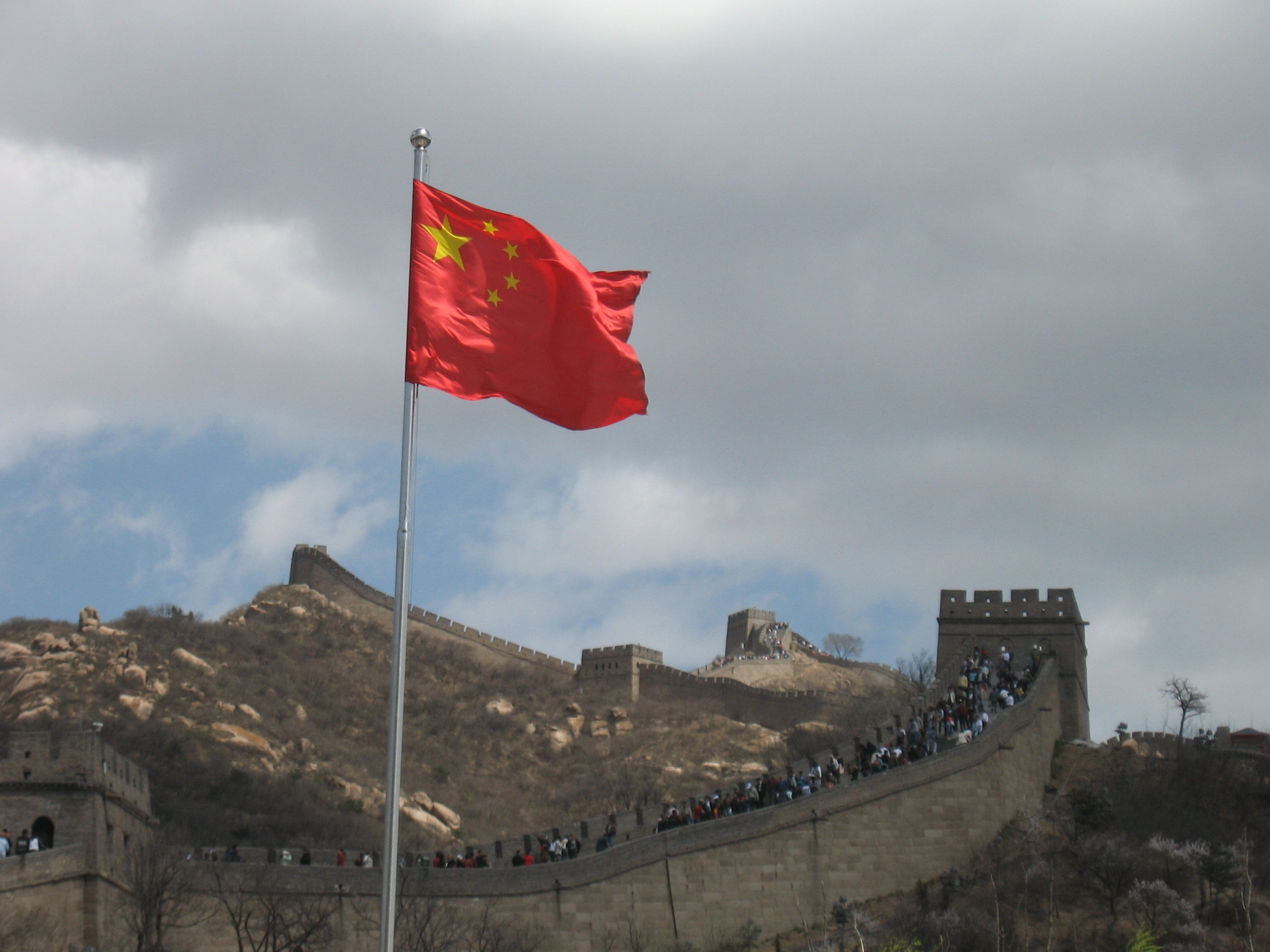
The Great Wall of China in May 2007 with many tourists and the PRC Flag.

=== Mexican drug cartels ===
Mexican drug cartels have used architecture as part of their overall propaganda campaign. Large houses called "narco mansions or narco castillos (drug mansions or castles)" are becoming an increasingly common feature of the recent drug conflicts in Mexico. To overwhelm and sway local populations and potential rivals, these demonstrations of wealth and power are built at least partly for their psychological value.

=== Nazi Germany ===
Nazi architecture is a commonly cited example of architectural propaganda. Adolf Hitler was personally fascinated with ancient Rome, and Nazi architecture adopted elements from classical antiquity. Part of the Nazi cult involved the overpowering and subsuming of the individual into the greater German volk. This giving over of oneself to the whole was also expressed through Nazi architecture. The three primary expressed roles found in Nazi architecture are the (i)Theatrical, (ii)Symbolic, and (iii)Didactic, but each of these roles has its own place within the larger sphere of propaganda value.

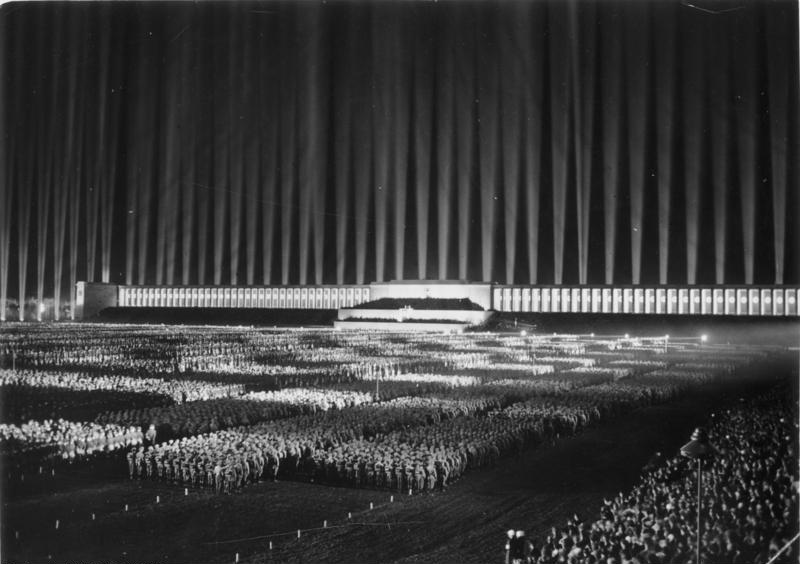
The Cathedral of Lights at the 1936 Nuremberg Party Rally.

Nazi architecture was designed to make the individual feel small and insignificant through its use of high ceilings. For example, at Nuremberg rallies, the feeling produced by the use of massed groups coupled with the architecture of the Zepplintribune architecture was to create wonder and a powerful feeling of community. Indeed, Hitler stated in one of his Nuremberg rally speeches, "Not every one of you sees me and I do not see every one of you. But I feel you and you feel me!". At the Nuremberg rallies, the overall effect of architecture was further enhanced through the use of many searchlights pointed directly upward to create a "Cathedral of Light" that even further served to invite the individual to buy into the Nazi worldview.

Another prominent conceptual feature of Nazi architecture was the "Theory of Ruin Value", first put forward by Albert Speer, Hitler's personal architect. This theory postulated that for a civilization's influence to pass beyond the existence of the civilization itself, it was important that aesthetically pleasing and impressive ruins be left by the dilapidated buildings of that civilization. This theory, too, took inspiration from the ancient Romans and Greeks in attempting to emulate the even architectural remains of their civilizations with Nazi ones in thousands of years. Since the original inspiration for Nazi architecture was itself, the ancient Romans and Greeks, it was important to Hitler that at the end of the Thousand Year Reich, the remains would inspire others as Roman ruins had done for him.

An interesting remaining piece of Nazi architecture can be found in the former Berlin Tempelhof Airport which closed all airport operations in 2008. The main terminal was designed and built during the late 1930s and early 1940s according to a design by Ernst Sagebiel following the ideas of Speer and Hitler including that of ruin value. It was designed to be the main hub for Hitler's redesigned Berlin, to be called Germania. When completed, it was the world's largest building and today, should the building fall into disrepair, Speer and Hitler's ruin value theory may be demonstrated.

=== North Korea ===
The Potemkin village of Kijŏng-dong, which was constructed to convey an image of North Korea as prosperity, and to encourage South Korean soldiers to defect, has been cited as an example of architectural propaganda by architect Richard Buday.

=== United States ===
Architectural propaganda has been used throughout the history of the United States. Early in its history as an independent country, neoclassical architecture was often employed to convey allusions to democracy, stability, and refinement.

During the New Deal, many government buildings were constructed in an Art Deco style in an effort to convey a modern and progressive image.

Modernist architecture became common in the United States during the time of the Cold War, and was used to demonstrate ideas such as efficiency and technological superiority.

During the 21st century, figures on the political right-wing in the United States have promoted the use of neoclassical architecture. Proposals for an America First Caucus have endorsed "European architecture" as "befitting a world power and source of freedom", and then-President Donald Trump passed an executive order mandating the use of neoclassical architecture in government buildings, and recommended demolishing or re-modeling existing modernist federal buildings. Trump's executive order was quickly overruled by subsequent President Joe Biden, and calls to discourage or prohibit non-classical architecture have been opposed by groups representing architects, and architectural firms. Some have also linked the uptick in interest in reviving classical architecture in the United States during this time with white nationalism.
