= Mirae Scientists Street =

Street in Pyongyang, North Korea

Coordinates: 38.9959°N 125.7401°E

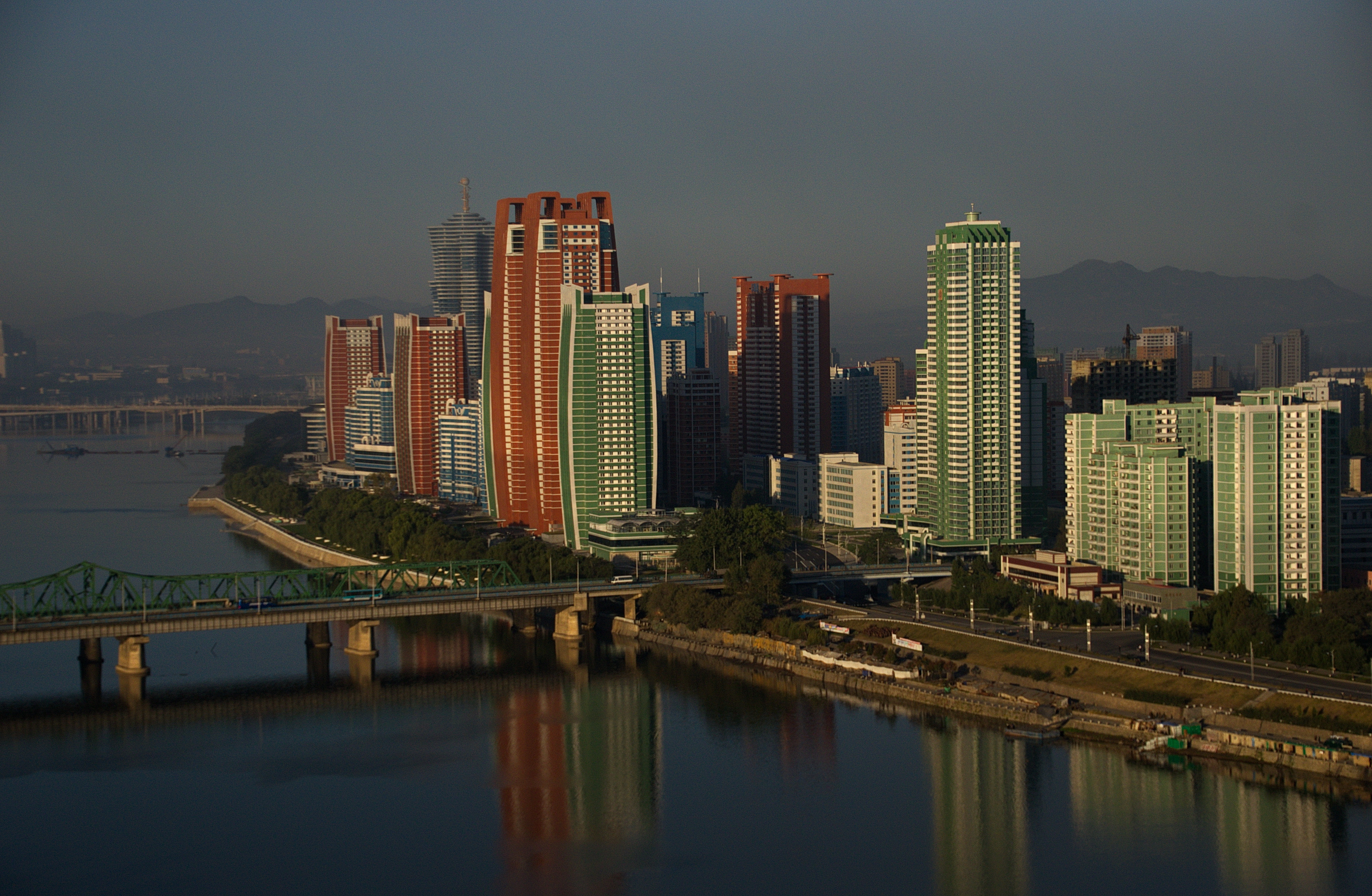

Korean name
- Hangul: 미래과학자거리
- Hanja: 未來 科學者 거리
- Lit.: Future Scientists Street
- RR: Mirae gwahakja geori
- MR: Mirae kwahakcha kŏri

Mirae Scientists Street (Korean: 미래과학자거리) is a street in Pyongyang, North Korea. It houses scientific institutions of the Kim Chaek University of Technology and their employees. The six-lane street, located between Pyongyang Railway station and the Taedong river, is lined by high rise apartments. The area was formally opened on 3 November 2015.

The tallest building is the 53-storey blue Mirae Unha Tower.

Mirae Scientists Street was reportedly the first location where the Mirae public WiFi network was installed.

== Gallery ==
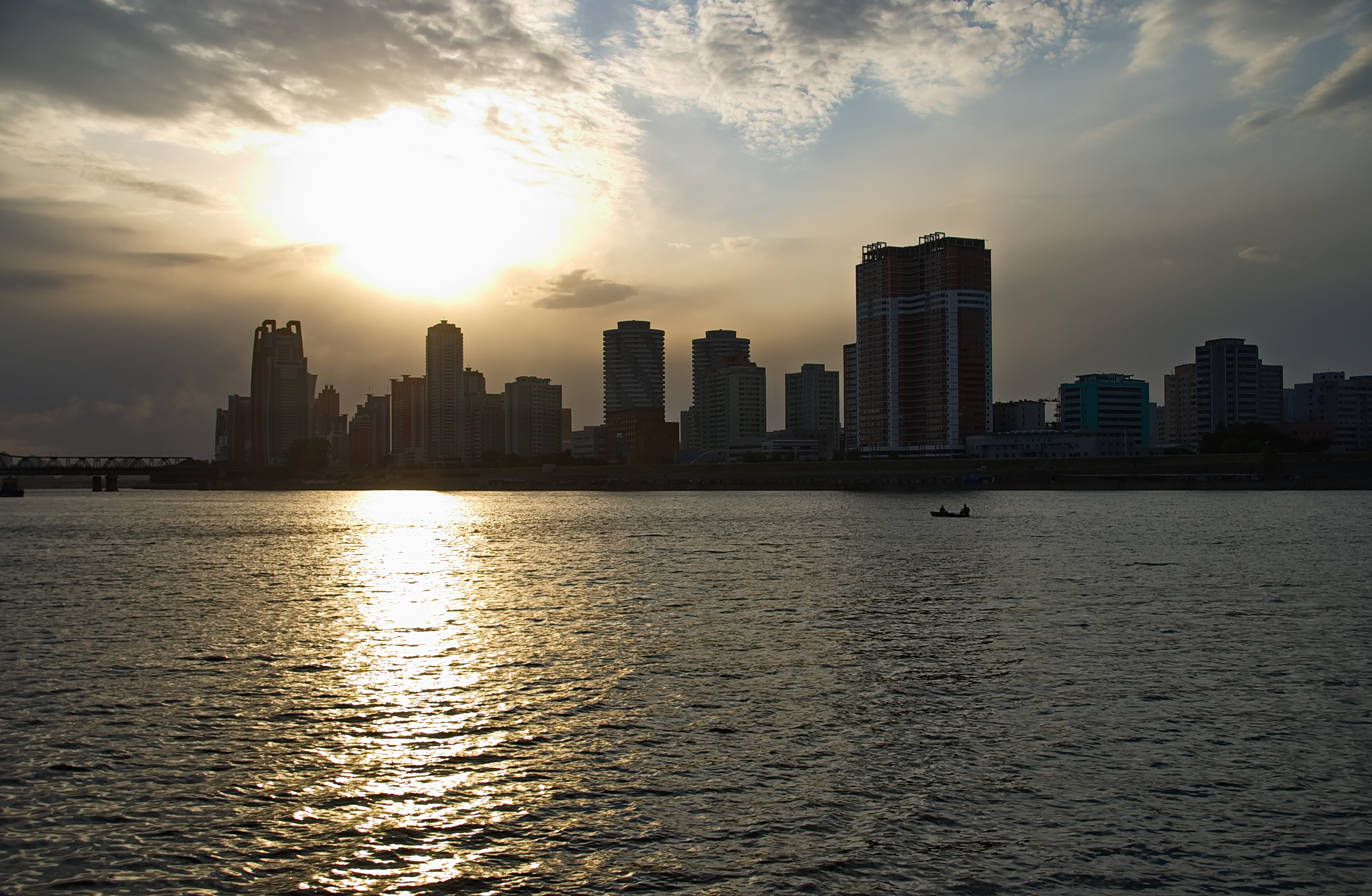

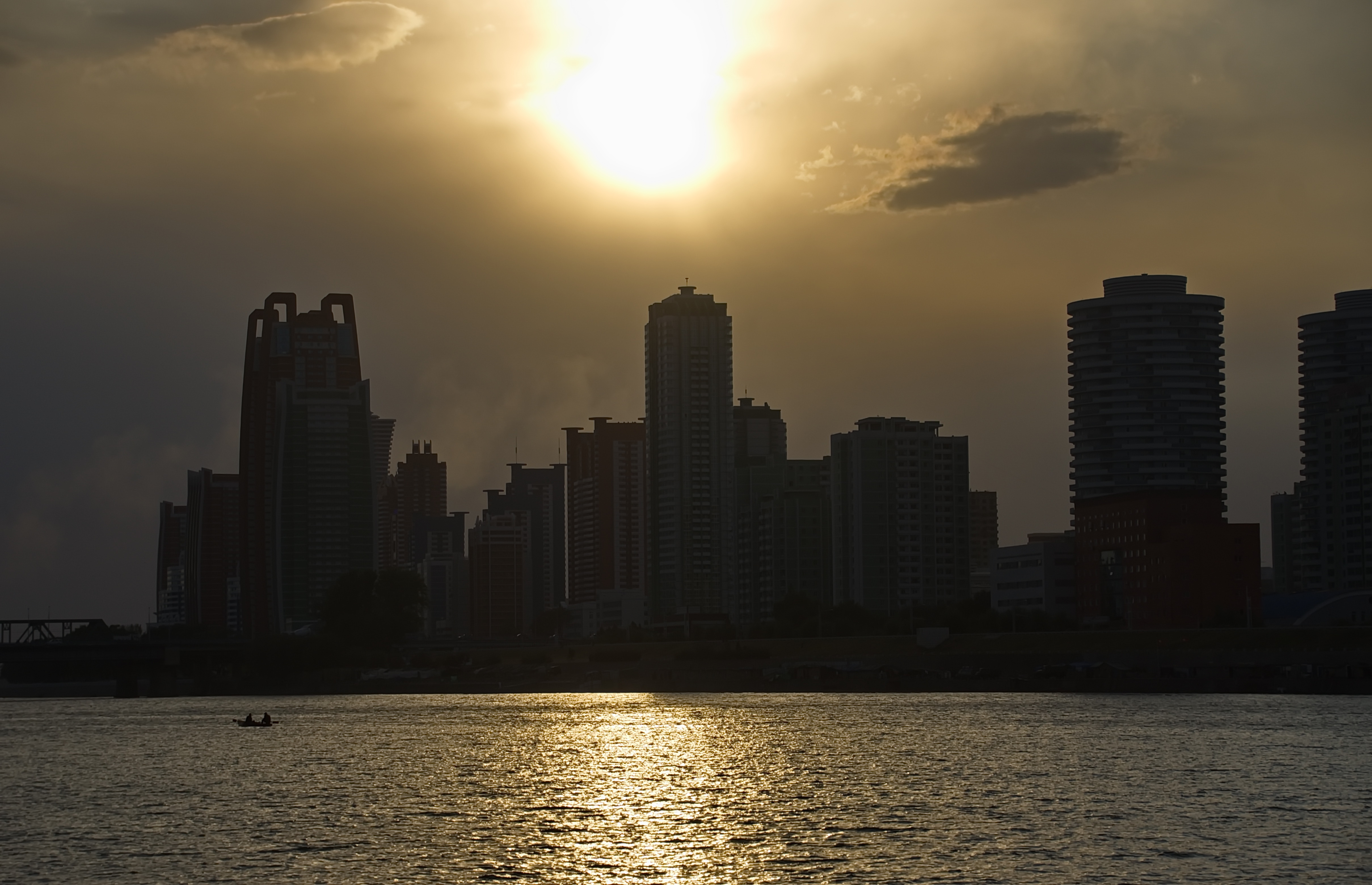

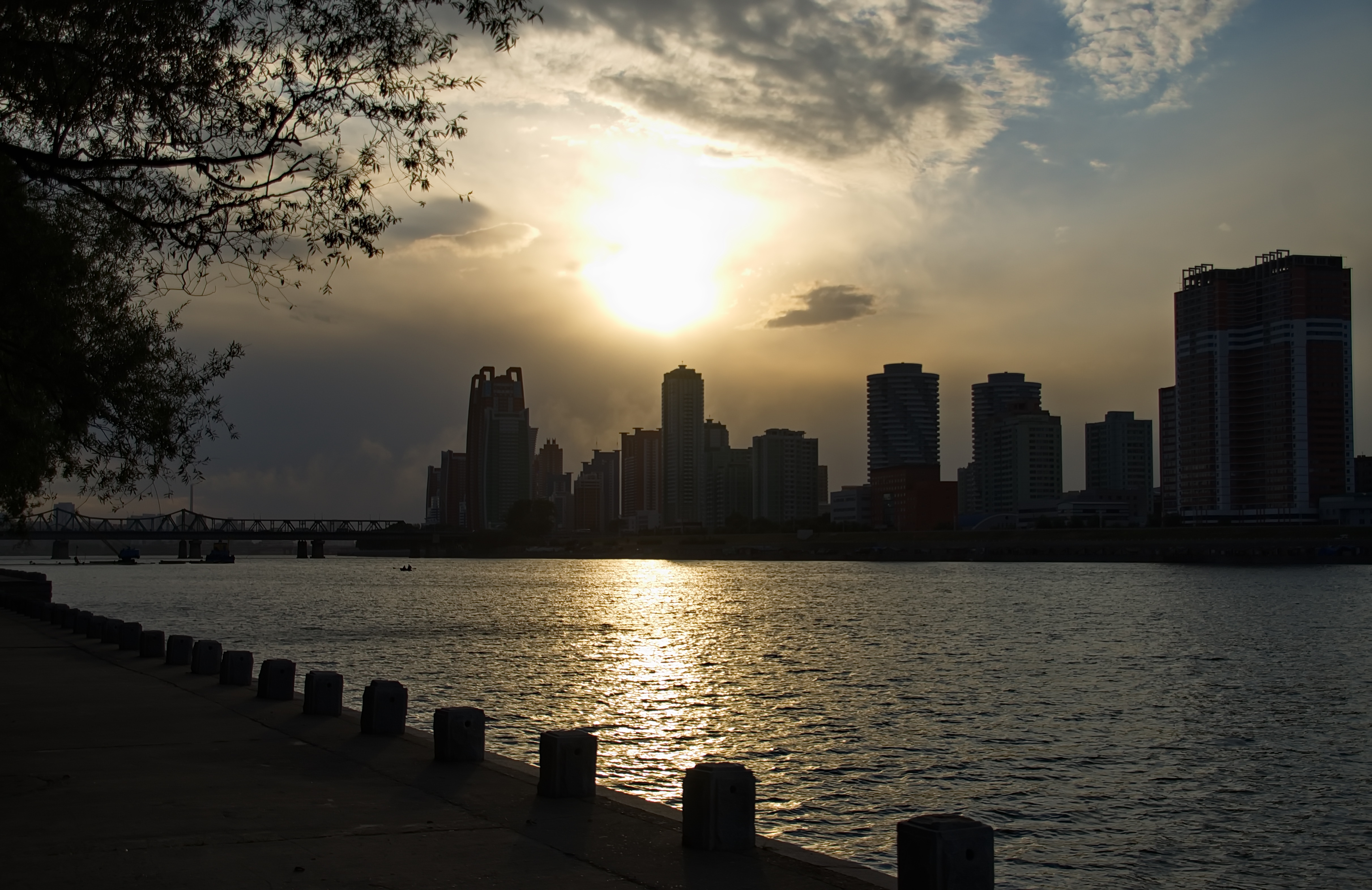

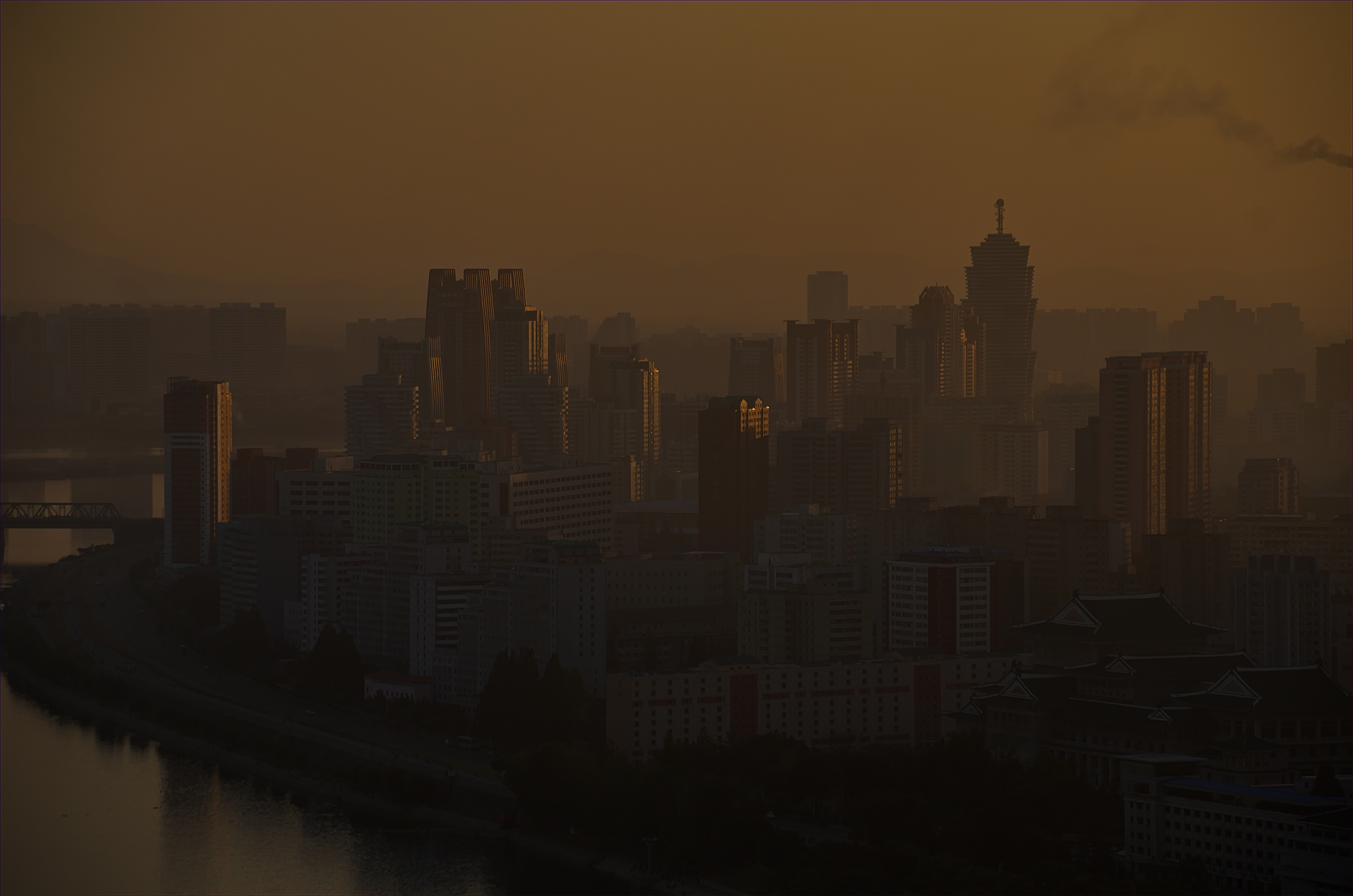

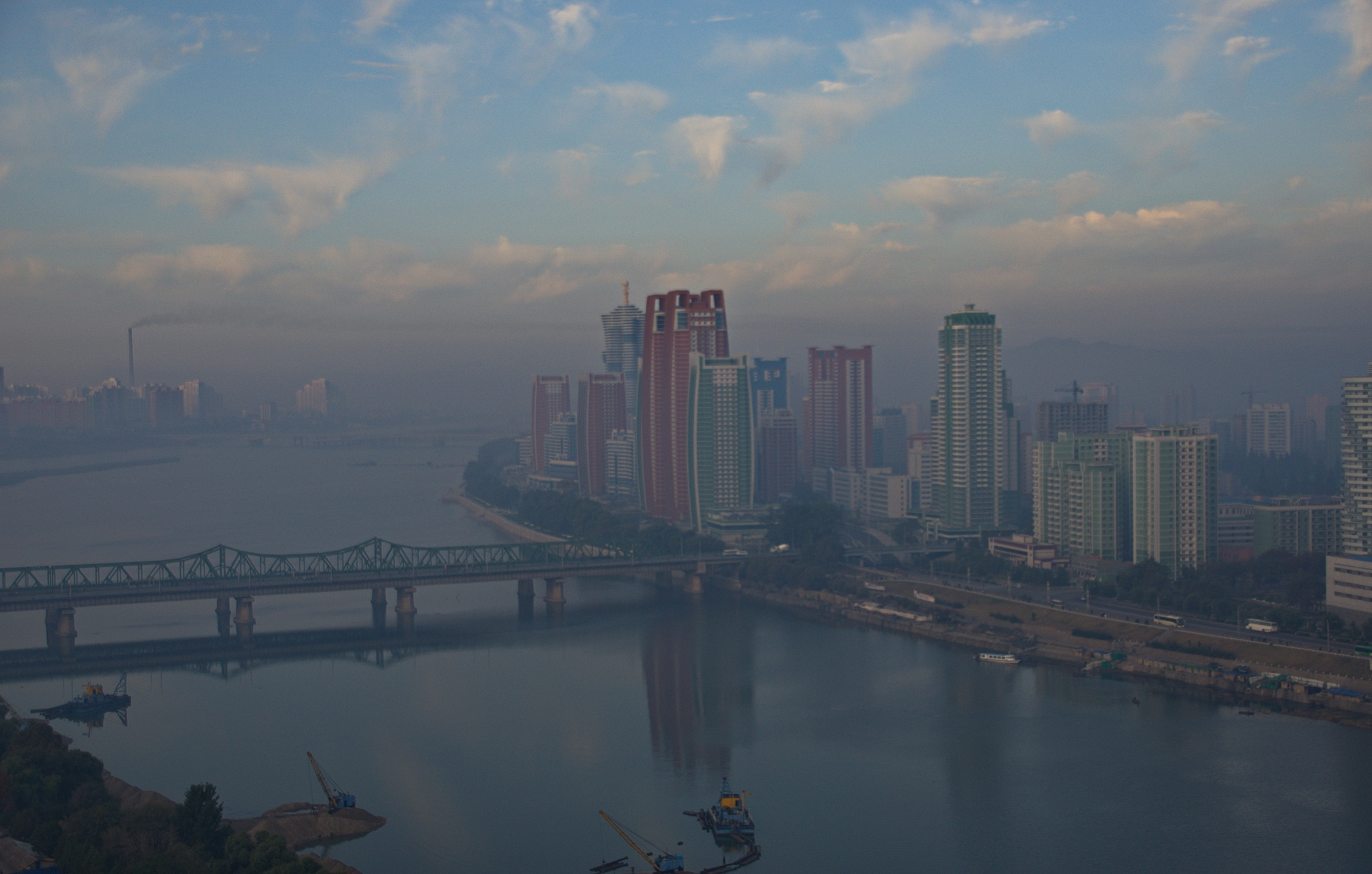

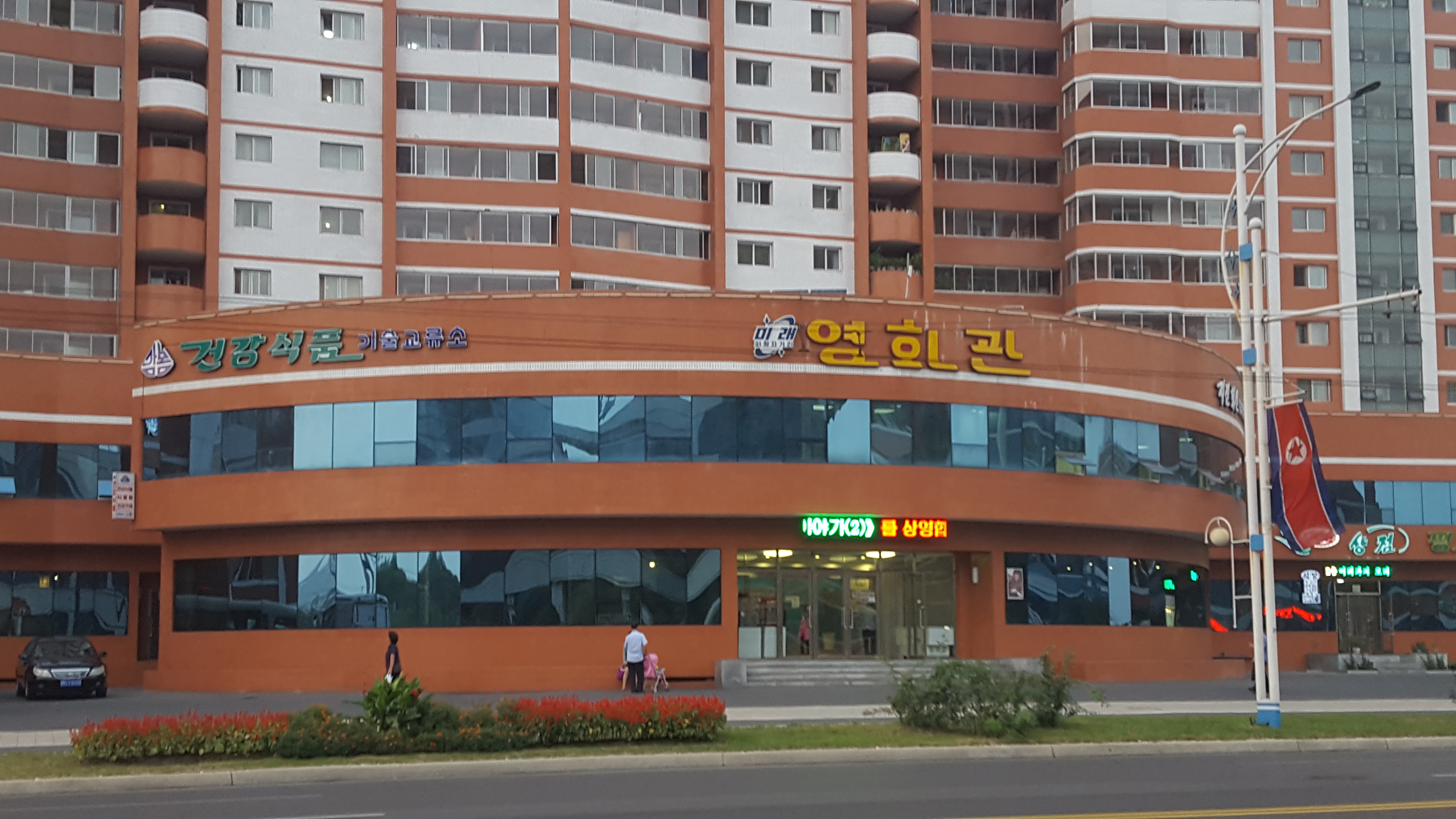
