= Taesong-guyok =

District of Pyongyang

Taesŏng-guyŏk 대성구역
- Guyŏk of Pyongyang

Korean transcription(s)
  - Hanja: 大城區域
  - McCune-Reischauer: Taesŏng-guyŏk
  - Revised Romanization: Daeseongguyeok
- Location of Taesong-guyok within Pyongyang
- Coordinates: 39°03′50″N 125°49′00″E
- Country: North Korea
- Direct-administered city: P'yŏngyang-Chikhalsi

Area
  - Total: 45.44 km^{2} (17.54 sq mi)

Population (2008)
  - Total: 115,739
  - Density: 2,547/km^{2} (6,597/sq mi)

- Taesong-guyok
- Chosŏn'gŭl: 대성구역
- Hancha: 大城區域
- Revised Romanization: Daeseongguyeok
- McCune–Reischauer: Taesŏng-guyŏk

Taesŏng-guyŏk, or Taesŏng District is one of the 19 guyok which constitute the city of Pyongyang, North Korea.

It had already been one of the ten guyoks in 1961.

== Administrative divisions ==
Taesŏng-guyŏk is divided into 15 dong (neighbourhoods):

- Anhak-dong 안학동 (安鶴洞)
- Ch'ŏng'am-dong 청암동 (淸岩洞)
- Ch'ŏngho-dong 청호동 (淸湖洞)
- Kammun-dong 갑문동 (閘門洞)
- Kosan-dong 고산동 (高山洞)
- Miam-dong 미암동 (嵋岩洞)
- Misan 1-dong 미산 1동 (嵋山 1洞)
- Misan 2-dong 미산 2동 (嵋山 2洞)
- Rimhŭng-dong 림흥동 (林興洞)
- Ryongbuk-dong 룡북동 (龍北洞)
- Ryonghŭng 1-dong 룡흥 1동 (龍興 1洞)
- Ryonghŭng 2-dong 룡흥 2동 (龍興 2洞)
- Ryonghŭng 3-dong 룡흥 3동 (龍興 3洞)
- Ryongnam-dong 룡남동 (龍南洞)
- Taesŏng-dong 대성동 (大城洞)
