= Totalitarian architecture =

Architecture of totalitarian states

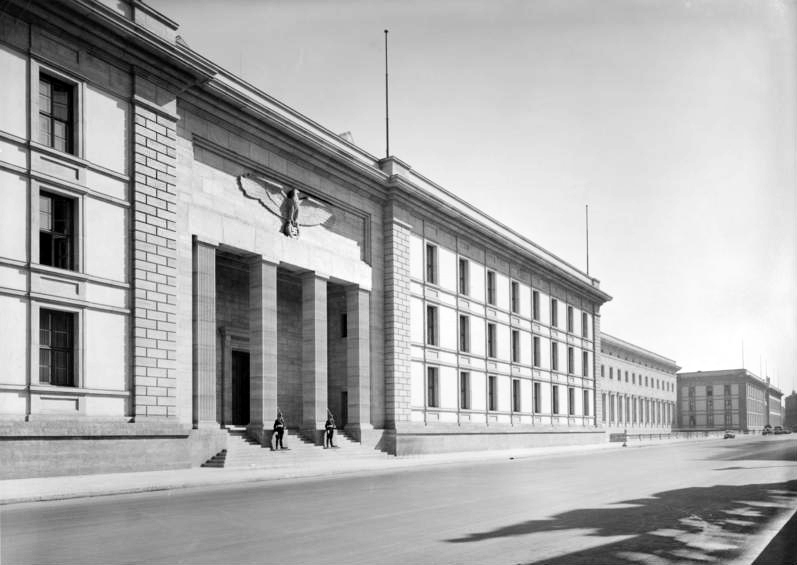
Historical photograph of the New Reich Chancellery in Berlin, Germany.

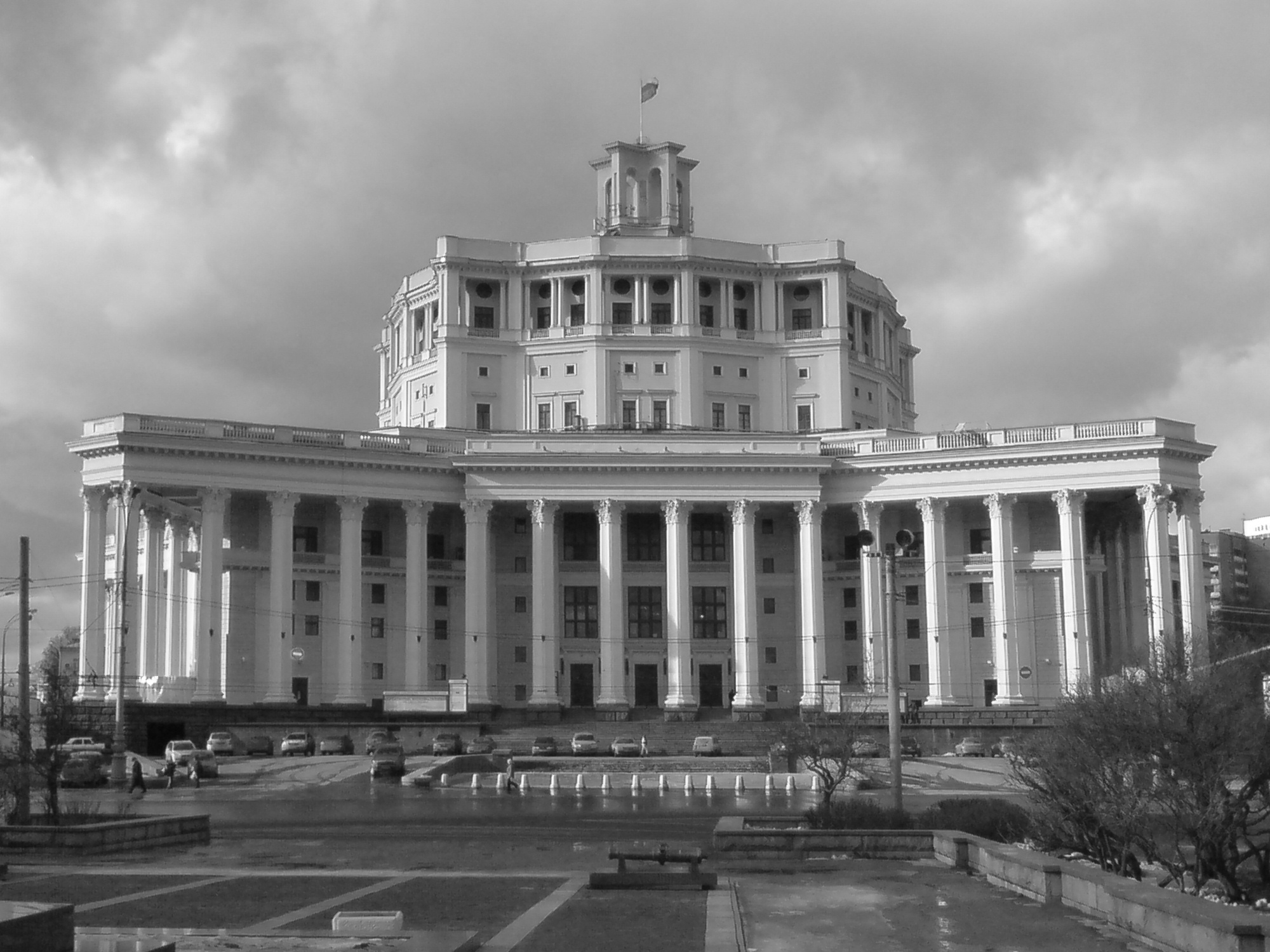
Historical photograph of Red Army Theatre in Moscow, Russia. It is designed in the shape of the communist star.

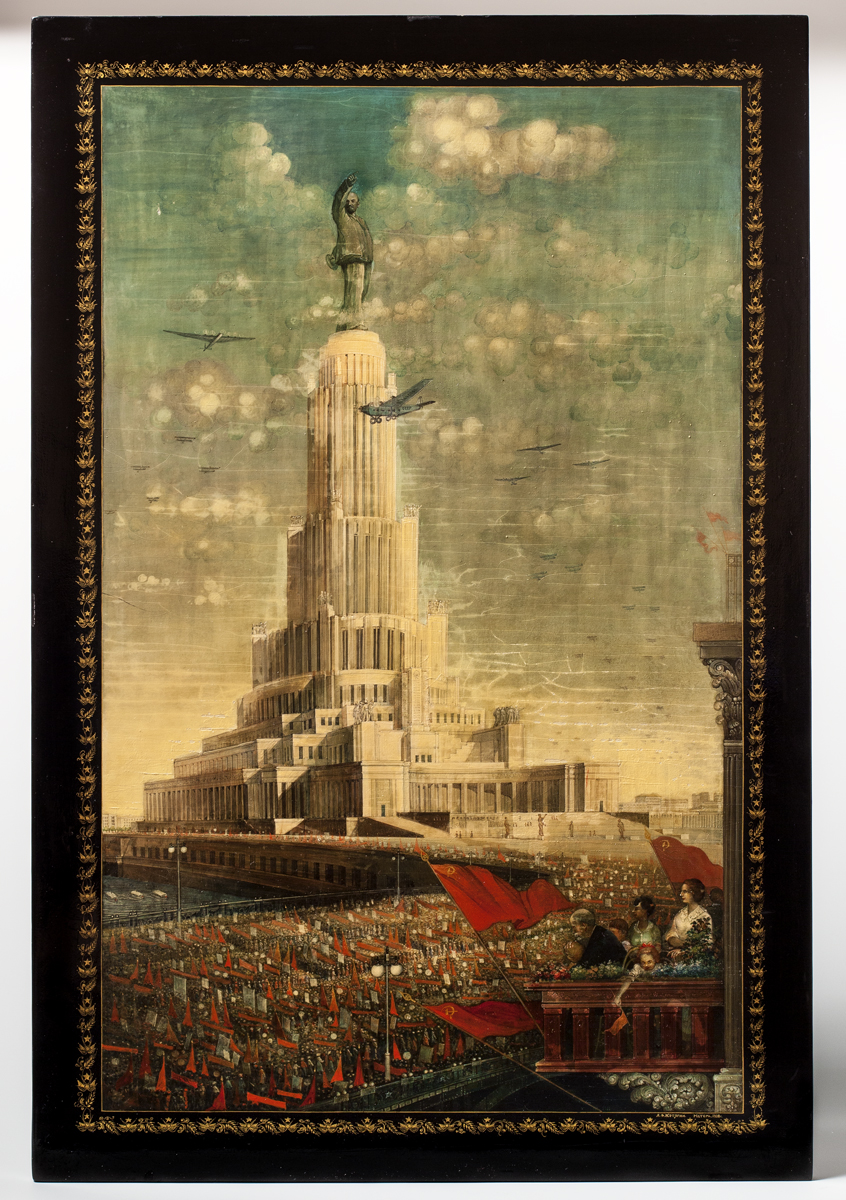
Palace of the Soviets was an unrealized project of the Soviet Union. Some projects of totalitarian architecture were never completed.

Totalitarian architecture encompasses the officially approved architectural styles under totalitarian regimes, especially Fascist Italy, Nazi Germany, and Stalin's Soviet Union. As an international style, it often drew on simplified Neoclassicism, and sculpture based on 19th-century realism and Classicism. Such architecture, often massive in size, was intended to support the leaders and the ideology of the regime.

Beyond Neoclassicism, which is not unique for totalitarian systems, the descriptions of totalitarian architecture sometimes focus on brutalism, often in the context of Le Corbusier and his associations with Benito Mussolini. Other authors have upheld brutalism and socialist realism as modernist art forms which exist beyond simply being physical manifestations of totalitarian ideology. Though many architects and architectural historians believe that significant similarities exist in the planning and construction of buildings within totalitarian regimes, it is frequently not considered a unique architectural style.

== Overview ==
=== Terminology and Application ===
The term "totalitarian architecture" appears in the scientific literature to compare architectures of Nazi Germany, Fascist Italy and Stalinist Soviet Union, all of which are characterized by large monumental forms and ideological orientation. Much of the study on architecture under totalitarian regimes and the related terminology was developed after the Second World War as people began to reconcile with extant buildings that invoked totalitarian ideals long after the associated regimes had collapsed. Redevelopment of cities involving large-scale demolition of previous buildings was often executed by totalitarian regimes as a way of physically reshaping society to the desires of the nascent totalitarian states and their leaders.

Architect and architectural historian Dmitry Khmelnitsky wrote that the concept of totalitarian architecture is usually associated with Stalin's neoclassicism and that it "strives to symbolize an abstract idea by architectural means. Usually, this is the idea of the greatness of statehood and power." Elizaveta Likhacheva, art historian and director of the Shchusev Museum of Architecture, has described the totalitarian architecture as a common terminology, but hardly a distinct well-defined architectural style. No true definition exists of a single unified style of "totalitarian architecture," and the term is generally considered a descriptor of the broad trends within the architecture of totalitarian regimes in Europe rather than as a school of architecture in and of itself.

The imperial style of Japan is sometimes also grouped under the label of totalitarian architecture. However, art historian Yu Suzuki argued that the totalitarian style in Japan was not nearly as uniform as in Germany or Italy due to the lack of direct control over architects.

=== Analysis ===
As all architecture is inherently a product of the society in which it was constructed, the architecture of totalitarian regimes can be used to glean information on the ethos and desires of its creators, making it a popular subject for analysis by architectural historians. The architecture of totalitarian regimes is often viewed in terms of how it manifests dominant state propaganda. While the architecture of fascist Italy, Germany, Portugal, and Spain often invoked notions of racial supremacy, nationalism, and Christian supremacy, Stalinist architecture (such as the Exhibition of Achievements of National Economy) frequently emphasize the successes of the Soviet Union in building a new society.

The goals of totalitarian regimes in constructing memorials to their leaders and the aesthetic qualities of religious architecture are often compared, such as Lenin's Mausoleum invoking the shape of the Pyramid of Djoser. Other tombs' architectural typologies, such as Ho Chi Minh Mausoleum and Georgi Dimitrov Mausoleum, have also been described as examples of architecture promoting communism as a political religion.

The Times columnist Ben Macintyre wrote that "Hitler, Stalin, Mao, Mussolini and Saddam all imagined vast cities constructed in their own honour. Stalin's Palace of the Soviets was to be higher than the Empire State Building. Hitler's Reich Chancellery was a deliberately theatrical statement, with towering brass doors 17ft high and the Führer's 4,000 sq ft 'study.' In 1984, written in 1948, George Orwell left a prescient description of the sort of totalitarian architecture that would soon dominate the Communist bloc, imposing and hideous: the Ministry of Truth, an "enormous, pyramidal structure of white concrete, soaring up terrace after terrace, three hundred metres into the air."

The remnants of the architecture of European totalitarian regimes can be seen as a part of European cultural heritage. According to the Council of Europe, "studying the architecture of Europe's totalitarian regimes...is a way to enhance the European identity in its unity and diversity. The idea of Europe originated from the wounds of World War II and the fall of Fascism and Nazism. It entered a new phase after the downfall of Communism, opening the way to a broader and more comprehensive idea of a Europe based on fundamental values such as political liberty, freedom of expression and assembly, democracy and the rule of law." The European cultural organization ATRIUM collects photographs of abandoned buildings which have outlived the regimes that constructed them and "that still stand as monuments to another time."

A number of buildings and memorials created by totalitarian regimes have been demolished, especially in Poland and Ukraine, based on legislation such as The Law on the Prohibition of Propagation of Communism or Any Other Totalitarian System Through The Names of All Public Buildings, Structures and Facilities. A demolition of the Palace of Culture and Science in Poland was debated.

== See also ==
- Architectural propaganda
- Architecture terrible
- Brutalist architecture
- Soviet urban planning ideologies of the 1920s
- Urban planning in communist countries
- Urban planning in Nazi Germany
- Utopian architecture
- ATRIUM
