= Rihyon station =

Railway station in North Korea

Rihyŏn 리현

Korean name
- Hangul: 리현역
- Hanja: 梨峴驛
- Revised Romanization: Rihyeon-yeok
- McCune–Reischauer: Rihyŏn-yŏk

General information
- Location: Rihyŏl-li, Sadong-guyŏk, P'yŏngyang; North Korea
- Owner: Korean State Railway

History
- Opened: 1 November 1925
- Original company: Chosen Government Railway

Services
Preceding station	Korean State Railway	Following station
Ch'ŏngryong Terminus	Myŏngdang Line	Taewŏn towards Myŏngdang
Location

Rihyŏn station is a railway station located in Rihyŏl-li, Sadong-guyŏk, P'yŏngyang, North Korea, on the Myŏngdang Line of the Korean State Railway.

== History ==
The station was opened by the Chosen Government Railway on 1 November 1925, as part of the Myŏngdang Line.
