= Moranbong-guyok =

District of Pyongyang, North Korea

Coordinates: 39.049186°N 125.761356°E

Moranbong-guyŏk
- Guyŏk of Pyongyang

Korean transcription(s)
  - Hangul: 모란봉구역
  - Hanja: 牡丹峰區域
  - Revised Romanization: Moranbong-guyeok
  - McCune–Reischauer: Moranbong-guyŏk
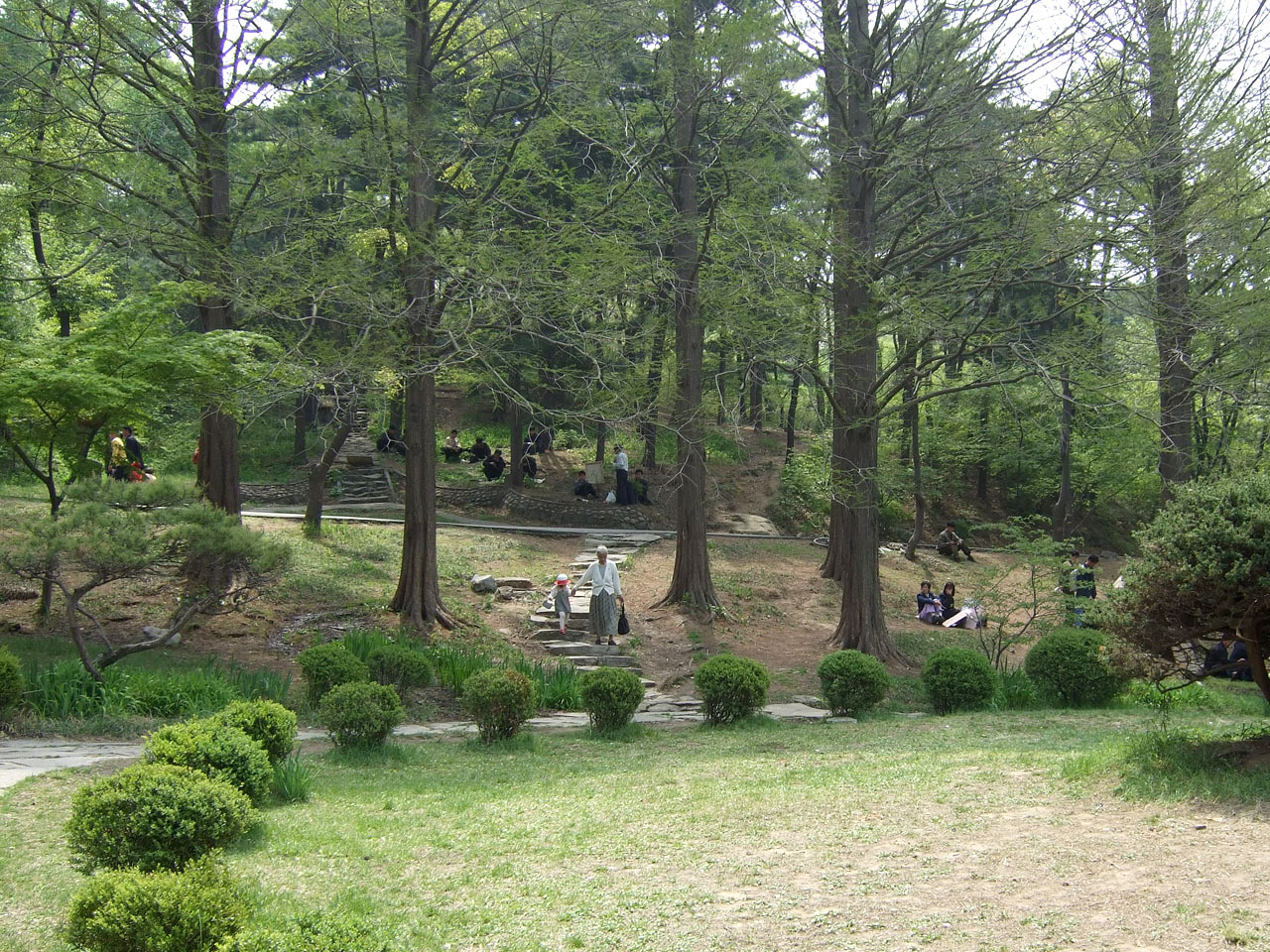
- Moranbong Hill

- Location of Moranbong-guyok within Pyongyang
- Country: North Korea
- Direct-administered city: P'yŏngyang-Chikhalsi
- Administrative divisions: 15 administrative dong

Area
  - Total: 4.8 km^{2} (1.9 sq mi)

Population (2008)
  - Total: 143,404
  - Density: 30,000/km^{2} (77,000/sq mi)

Moranbong-guyŏk (Korean: 모란봉구역), or the Moranbong District, is one of the 19 guyok which constitute the city of Pyongyang, North Korea. It is located north of Chung-guyok, the city's central district, and is bordered to the north by Sosong and Taesong-guyoks, to the east by the Taedong River, and the west by the Pothonggang Canal and Potonggang-guyok. It is named after Moran Hill, located in the district's west area – Moran (Korean for 'peony'). It was designated a guyŏk in October 1960 by the Pyongyang City People's Committee.

== Overview ==
A large part of the district is taken up by the Moranbong Park, Pyongyang's largest recreation area, which contains historic relics, including vestiges of the old Pyongyang Castle walls and various ornamental pavilions. The district is also home to the Kim Il Sung Stadium and the site of Kim's first speech after the liberation of Pyongyang on 14 October 1945, called "Every Effort for the Building of a New Democratic Korea". The Pyongyang Arch of Triumph, the world's largest such arch, is also located in the district.

== Transport ==
The Pyongyang Metro runs through this district, with stops at Tongil, Kaeson, Chonu, and Chonsung stations. It is connected to Rungra Island and Taedonggang-guyŏk (on the Taedong's left bank) by the Rungra Bridge.

== Administrative divisions ==
Moranbong-guyok is divided into fifteen administrative districts known as dong. The largest neighborhoods (Inhung, Pipa, and Kinmaul) are further divided in two parts for administrative purposes. Inhung District is the home of North Korea's State Administration of Quality Management.

	Chosŏn'gŭl	Hancha
Changhyŏn-dong	장현동	長峴洞
Ch'ilsŏngmun-dong	칠성문동	七星門洞
Chinhŭng-dong	진흥동	進興洞
Chŏnsŭng-dong	전승동	戰勝洞
Chŏnu-dong	전우동	戰友洞
Hŭngbu-dong	흥부동	興富洞
Inhŭng-dong	인흥동	仁興洞
Kaesŏn-dong	개선동	凱旋洞
Kinmaŭl-dong	긴마을동	긴마을洞
Minhŭng-dong	민흥동	民興洞
Pip'a-dong	비파동	琵琶洞
Puksae-dong	북새동	北塞洞
Sŏhŭng-dong	서흥동	西興洞
Sŏngbuk-dong	성북동	城北洞
Wŏrhyang-dong	월향동	月香洞
