= Chongryong station =

Railway station in Pyongyang, North Korea

Ch'ŏngryong 청룡

General information
- Location: Kŭmt'al-li, Sadong-guyŏk, P'yŏngyang; North Korea
- Coordinates: 39°1′11″N 125°54′45″E
- Owner: Korean State Railway

History
- Opened: 1 November 1925
- Original company: Chosen Government Railway

Services
Preceding station	Korean State Railway	Following station
Ripsŏngri towards Kujang Ch'ŏngnyŏn	P'yŏngdŏk Line	Mirim towards P'yŏngyang
Terminus	Myŏngdang Line	Rihyŏn towards Myŏngdang
Location

- Chongryong station
- Chosŏn'gŭl: 청룡역
- Hancha: 靑龍驛
- Revised Romanization: Cheongnyong-yeok
- McCune–Reischauer: Ch'ŏngryong-yŏk

Ch'ŏngryong station is a railway station located in Kŭmt'al-li, Sadong-guyŏk, P'yŏngyang, North Korea, on the P'yŏngdŏk Line of the Korean State Railway. It is also the starting point of the Myŏngdang Line to Myŏngdang.

== History ==
The station was opened by the Chosen Government Railway on 1 November 1925, at the same time as the rest of the Myŏngdang Line.
