= Ongryu Bridge =

Road bridge in Pyongyang, North Korea

Coordinates: 39°1′30″N 125°45′40″E

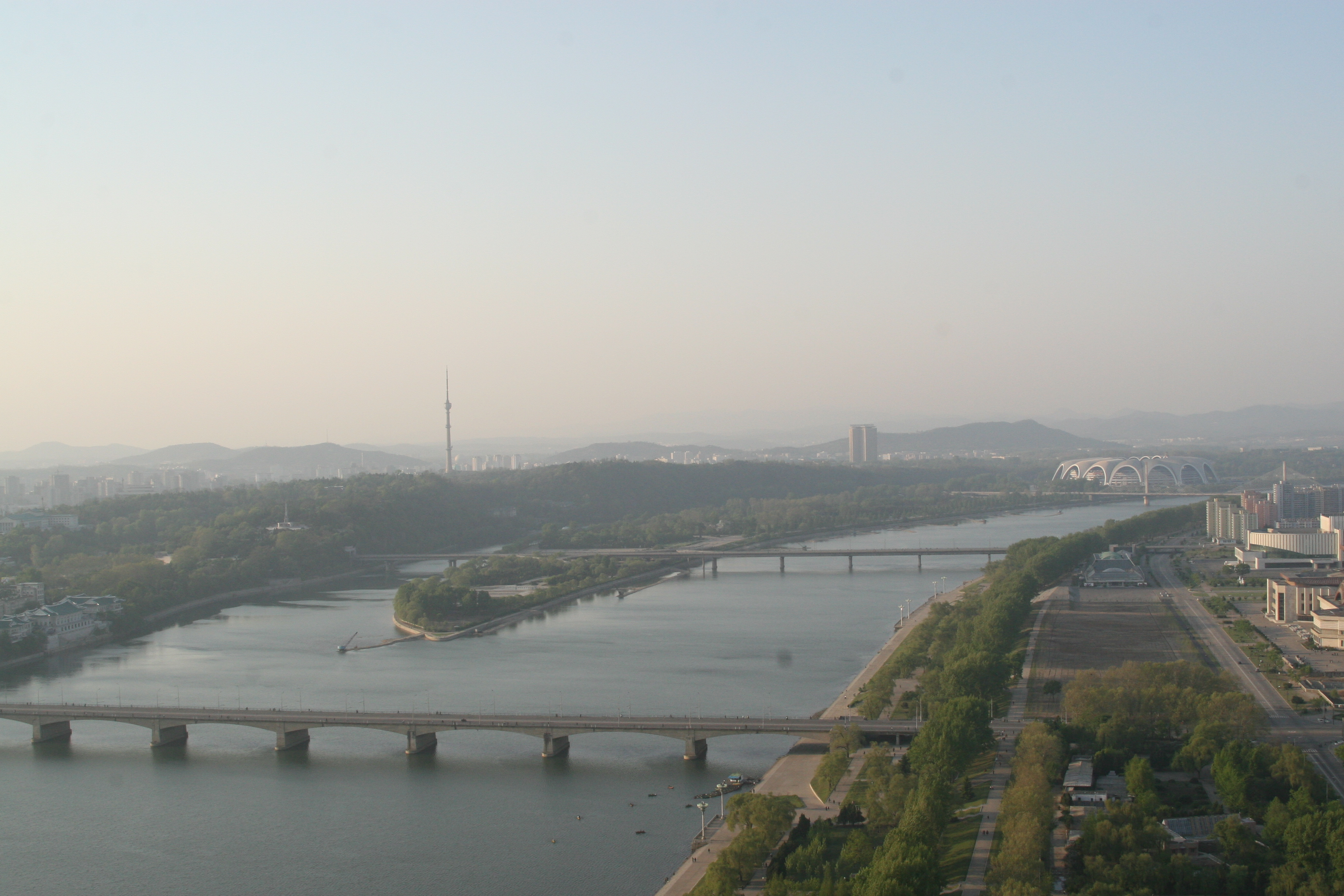
- From the top of the Juche Tower facing north, the Okryu Bridge is in the foreground, with Rungra Islet and Moran Hill behind it

Korean name
- Hangul: 옥류교
- Hanja: 玉流橋
- RR: Ongnyugyo
- MR: Ongnyugyo

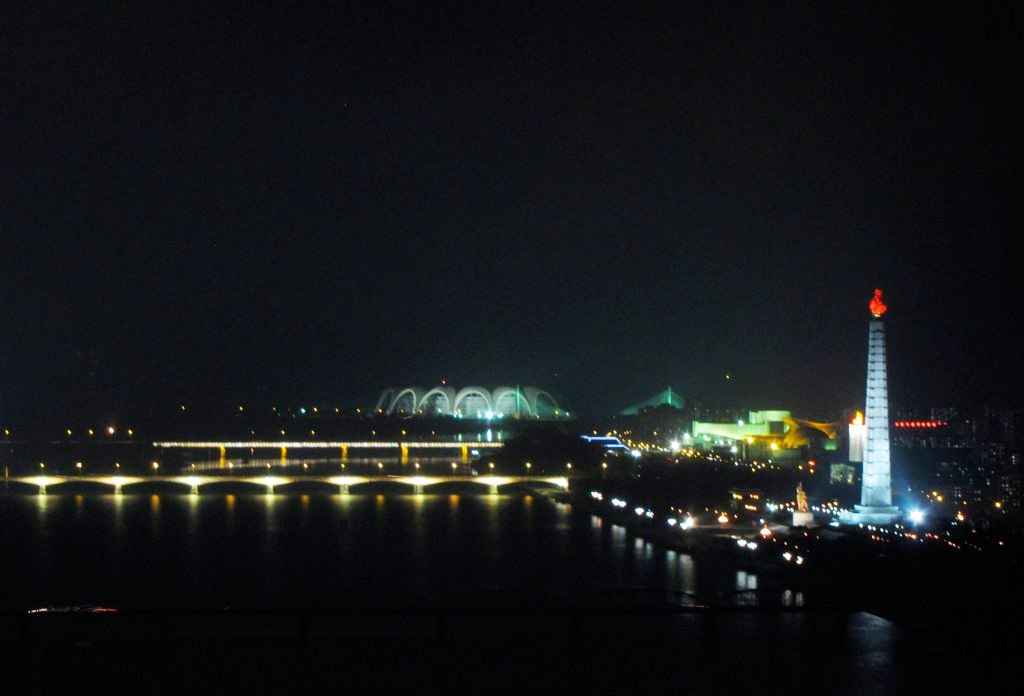
The Ongryu Bridge (centre) at night, with the Juche Tower visible on the right

Ongryu Bridge, also spelled Okryu Bridge and Ongnyu Bridge, is a bridge on the Taedong River in and near Pyongyang, North Korea. Construction began in March 1958; the bridge was opened in August 1960.

Located between the old Taedong Bridge before it and the Rungra Bridge above it, it is the fourth (heading upstream) of six Pyongyang bridges on the Taedong. It connects Chung-guyok on the Taedong's right (west) bank to Taedonggang-guyok on the left bank. The famous restaurant Okryu-gwan is near its right foot, while the Juche Tower is located just south of its left foot.

== Construction ==
Ongryu Bridge is a prestressed concrete box girder bridge measuring approximately 700 by 28.5 metres (2,297 by 94 ft), with four lanes for cars.
