= Mirim station =

Railway station in Pyongyang, North Korea

Mirim 미림

Korean name
- Hangul: 미림역
- Hanja: 美林驛
- Revised Romanization: Mirim-yeok
- McCune–Reischauer: Mirim-yŏk

General information
- Location: P'yŏngyang; North Korea
- Owner: Korean State Railway

History
- Opened: 5 May 1918
- Original company: Chosen Government Railway

Services
Preceding station	Korean State Railway	Following station
Ch'ŏngryong towards Kujang Ch'ŏngnyŏn	P'yŏngdŏk Line	Songsin towards P'yŏngyang
Location

Mirim station is a freight-only railway station located in P'yŏngyang, North Korea, on the P'yŏngdŏk Line of the Korean State Railway.

== History ==
The station was opened by the Chosen Government Railway on 5 May 1918, as part of the second section of the P'yŏngyang Colliery Line.

== Services ==
The freight-only station at Mirim is responsible for handling freight for the Taedonggang-guyŏk, Taesong-guyŏk and Sadong-guyŏk districts of P'yŏngyang. The main commodities arriving there are anthracite from Namdŏk, Hŭngryŏng and elsewhere, and cement from the Sŭngho-ri Cement Factory at Sŭngho-ri.
