= Rungra Bridge =

Bridge in Pyongyang, North Korea

Coordinates: 39°2′2″N 125°45′53″E

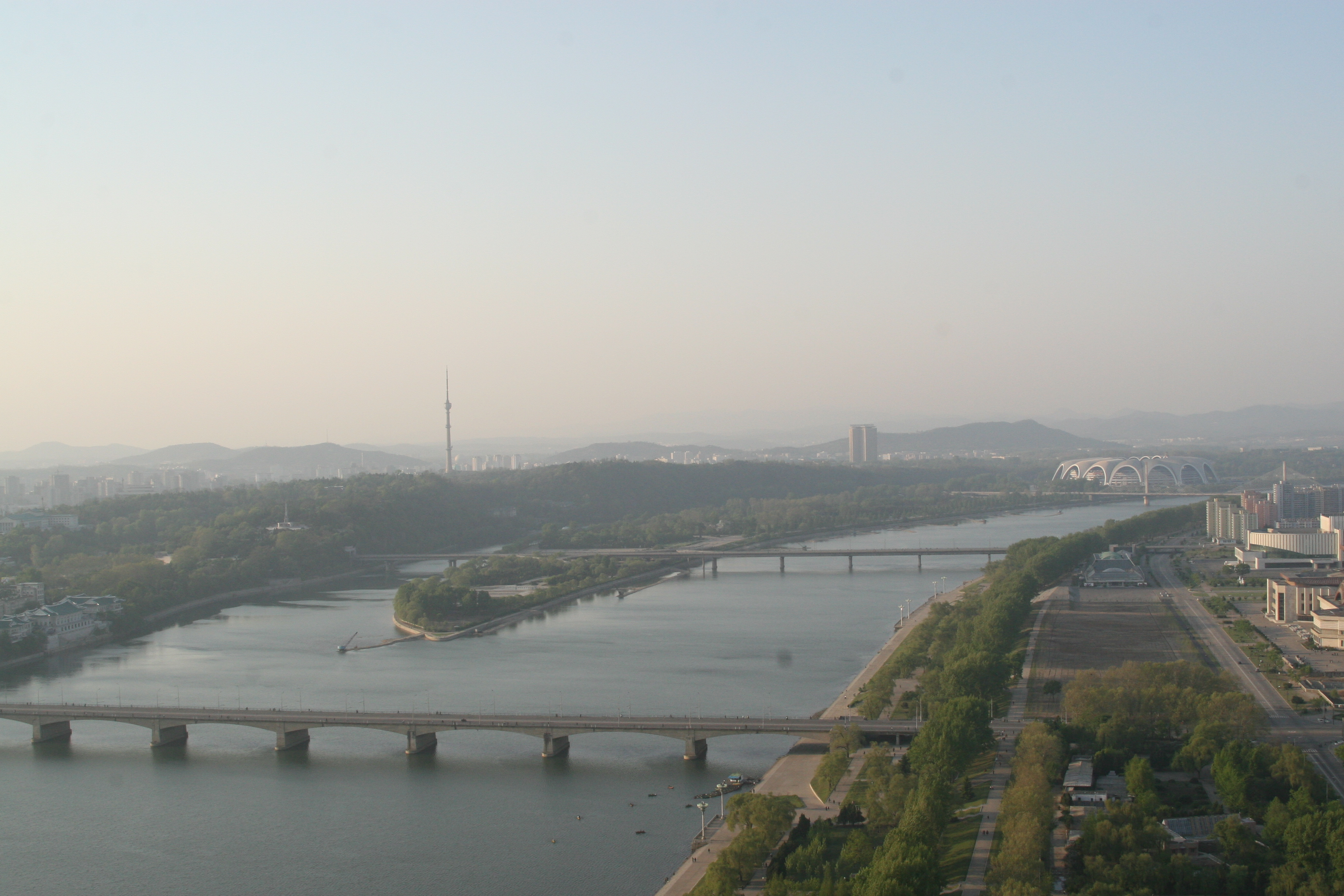
- From the top of the Juche Tower facing north, three bridges across the Taedong River are visible: the Okryu Bridge in the foreground, then Rungna Bridge, Chongryu Bridge in the background

Korean name
- Hangul: 릉라교
- Hanja: 綾羅橋
- RR: Reungnagyo
- MR: Rŭngnagyo

The Rungra Bridge is a bridge in Pyongyang, North Korea, one of the city's six bridges on the Taedong River. Located between the Okryu Bridge to the south and Chongryu Bridge to the north, it connects Moranbong-guyok on the right (west) bank of the Taedong River with Taedonggang-guyok on the left bank, passing through Rungra Island in the middle. It totals 1,070 metres (3,510 ft) in length. It was completed in 1988.
