= Jonu station =

Pyongyang Metro station

Jŏnu station 전우역
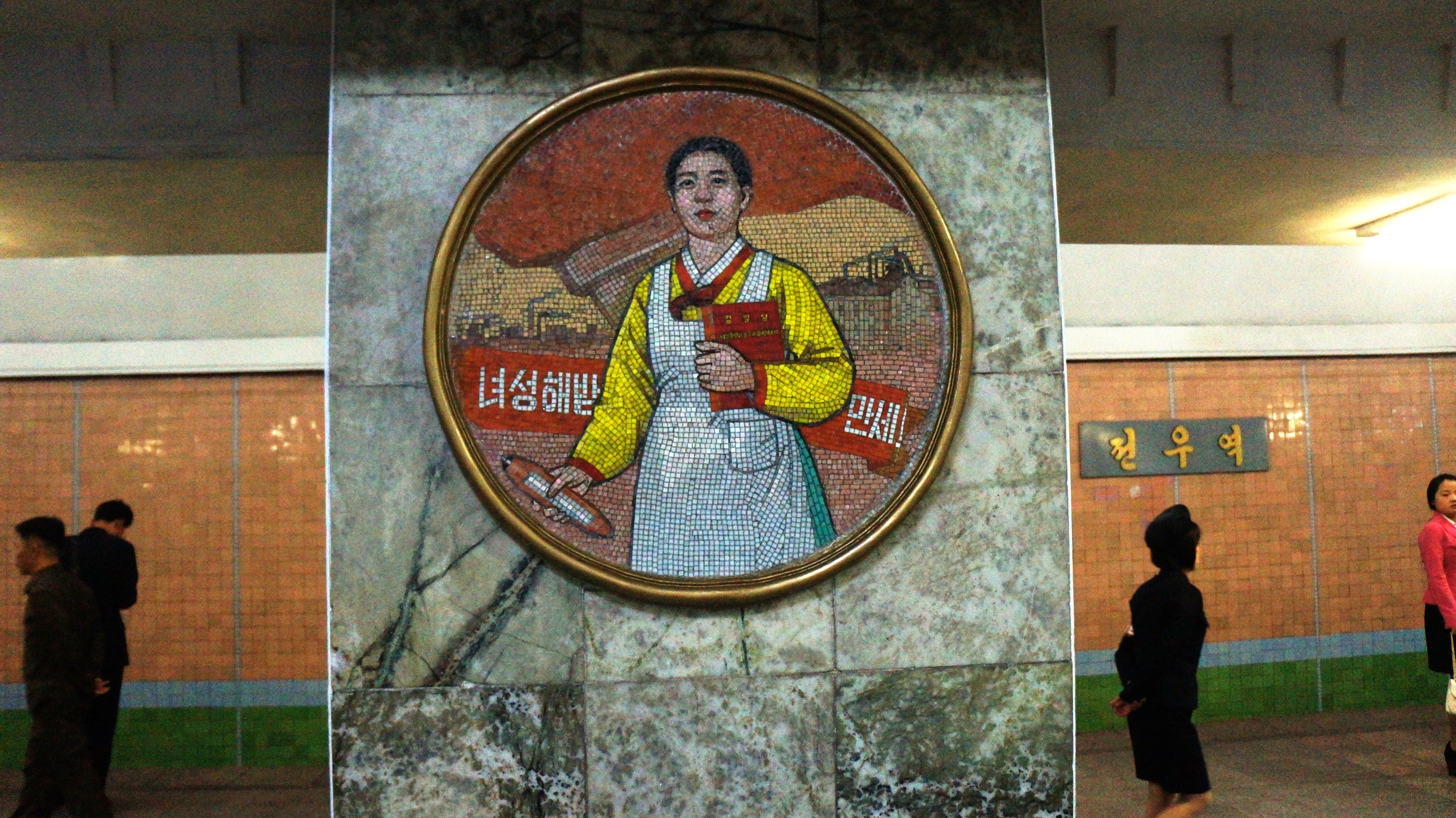
- Mosaic at the Jonu metro station, "Long live women's liberation!"

General information
- Location: Moranbong-guyok, Pyongyang; Democratic People's Republic of Korea
- Coordinates: 39°3′29.6″N 125°45′22.4″E
- Platforms: 1
- Tracks: 2
- Connections: Hyoksin Line (Chonsung station)

Services
Preceding station	Pyongyang Metro	Following station
Kaeson towards Puhung	Chollima Line	Pulgunbyol Terminus
Location

Jŏnu station is a station on Chŏllima Line of the Pyongyang Metro. It is located a short distance from Chonsung station.

This station was renovated in 2020, featuring TVs and electronic displays.
