= Tongpyongyang station =

Railway station in Pyongyang, North Korea

Coordinates: 38.9739°N 125.7756°E

East P'yŏngyang 동평양

Korean name
- Hangul: 동평양역
- Hanja: 東平壌驛
- Revised Romanization: Dongpyeongyang-yeok
- McCune–Reischauer: Tongp'yŏngyang-yŏk

General information
- Location: P'yŏngyang; North Korea
- Owner: Korean State Railway

History
- Opened: after 1953

Services
Preceding station	Korean State Railway	Following station
Songsin towards Kujang Ch'ŏngnyŏn	P'yŏngdŏk Line	Taedonggang towards P'yŏngyang
Location

Tongp'yŏngyang station (East P'yŏngyang station) is a railway station located in P'yŏngyang, North Korea, on the P'yŏngdŏk Line of the Korean State Railway.

== History ==
The station was opened by the Korean State Railway after the end of the Korean War as part of the realignment of the Taedonggang–Mirim section of the P'yŏngdŏk Line.
