= Okryu-gwan =

Restaurant in Pyongyang, North Korea

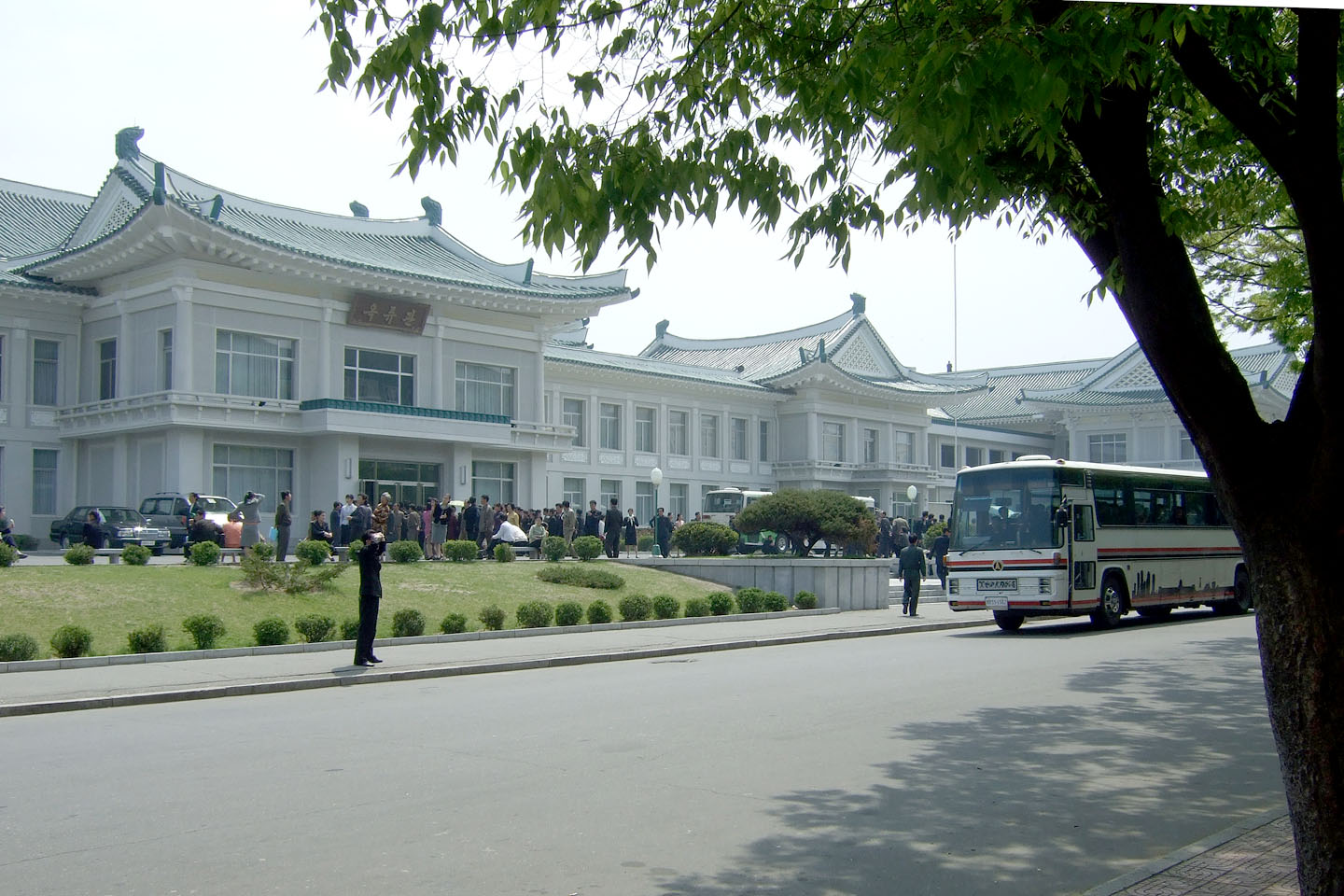

Restaurant information
- Established: 1960
- Head chef: Ra Suk-gyong
- Location: Pyongyang, North Korea
- Coordinates: 39°1′43″N 125°45′30″E

- Okryu-gwan
- Hangul: 옥류관
- Hanja: 玉流館
- Lit.: Jade Stream Pavilion
- RR: Ongnyugwan
- MR: Ongnyugwan

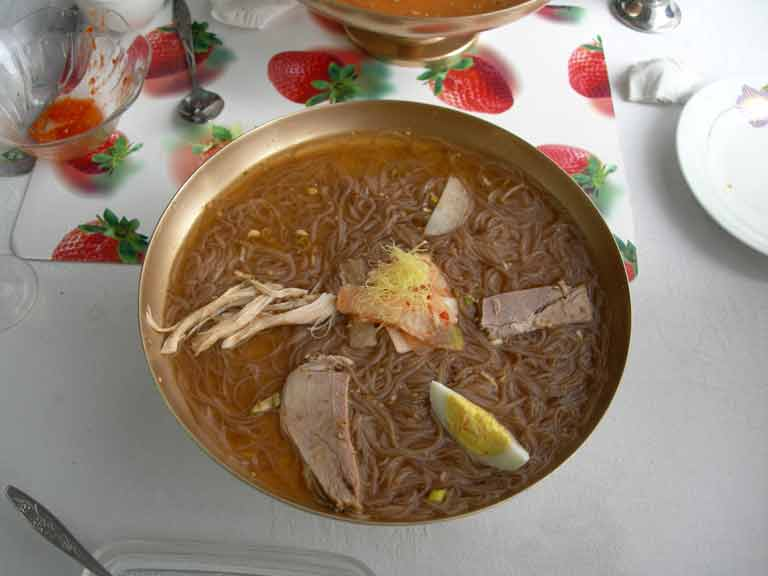
Raengmyŏn (Pyongyang-style cold noodles) served at Okryugwan

Okryu-gwan or Okryu Restaurant is a restaurant in Pyongyang, North Korea, founded in 1960. South Korea analyst Andrei Lankov describes it as one of two restaurants, the other being Ch'ongryugwan, which have "defined the culinary life of Pyongyang" since the 1980s, and a "living museum of culinary art".

== Building and location ==
Okryu-gwan is located on the bank of the Taedong River, between Moran Hill and the Okryu Bridge. It is a large building, and can seat up to 2,000 patrons, which Lankov described as reflecting "a penchant for large-scale eateries ... common to all Communist regimes". The building is distinguished by its traditional architecture and curved green roofs. The building is divided into a main area and two wings, with a total floor area of 12,000 m^{2} (130,000 sq ft). The stairs are made of granite from Ryonggang, South Pyongan Province. According to the North's official Korean Central News Agency, the building was renovated in 2008.

Ahn Young-gi, who supervised the original design and construction of the restaurant, was soon after dispatched to South Korea as a spy, and spent 38 years in prison there before being repatriated to North Korea in 2000 along with 62 other unconverted long-term prisoners. He returned home to a hero's welcome, even receiving a personal congratulations from Kim Jong Il on the occasion of his 80th birthday in 2009.

== Cuisine ==
Okryu-gwan is famous for its raengmyŏn, Pyongyang-style cold noodles. The restaurant sends research teams into the North Korean countryside to collect data on Korean cuisine and introduce new recipes. Other dishes that the KCNA reports are served at Okryu-gwan include gray mullet soup with boiled rice, beef rib soup, green bean pancake, and sinsollo (a soup made from various ingredients including meat, fish, vegetable, pine nuts, gingko nuts, and mushrooms).

== Branches outside North Korea ==
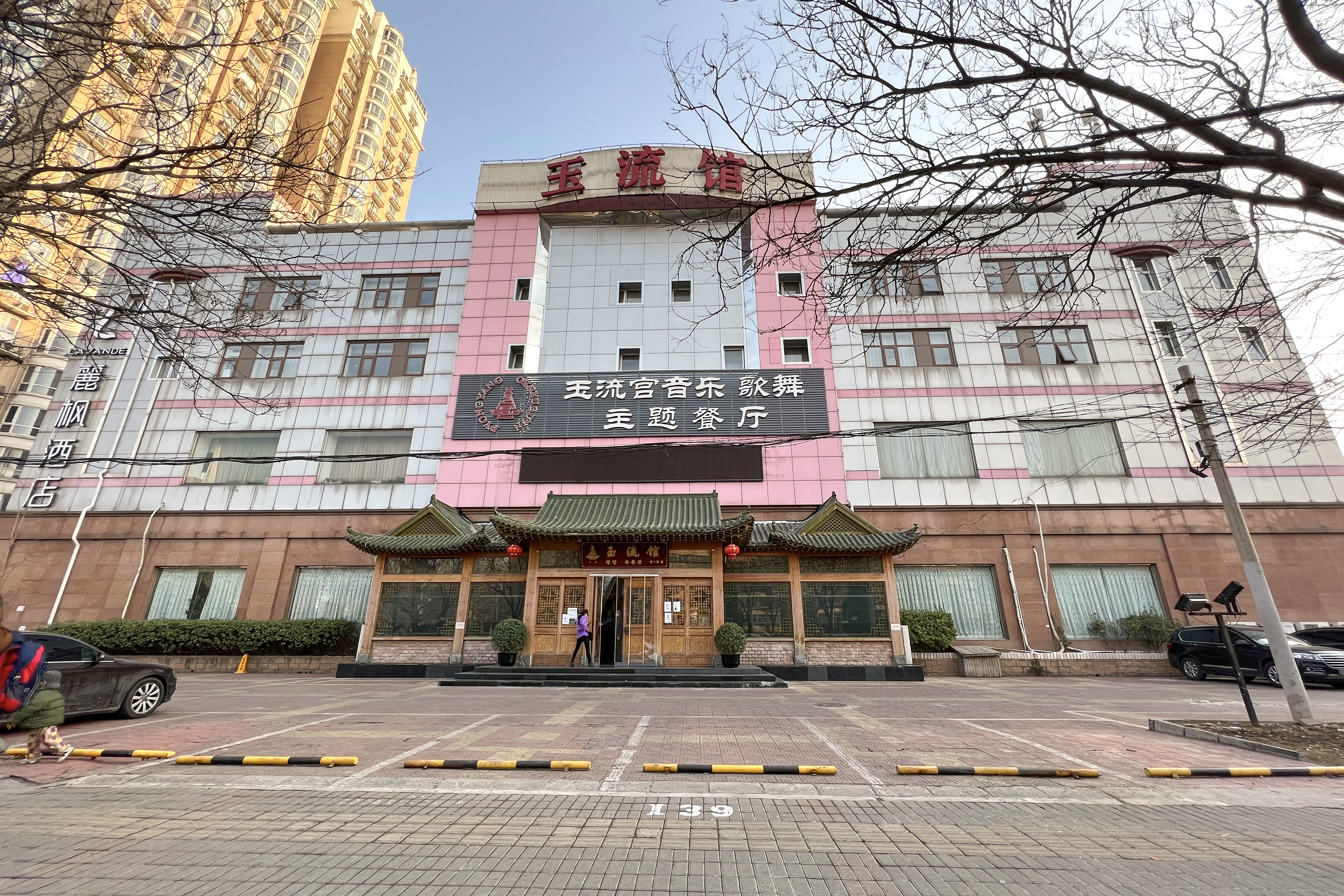
Okryu-gwan branch in Wangjing, Beijing, China in 2022

The Japan-based Korean residents' association Chongryon has authorisation to open overseas branches of Okryu-gwan. Okryu-gwan has various branches throughout China, which help the North Korean government to earn badly needed foreign currency. Okryu-gwan is thus well-known even in South Korea. Each restaurant is reportedly required to remit US$100,000 to US$300,000 to Pyongyang per year, depending on local conditions. As a result, they market themselves aggressively, even purchasing advertisements in local South Korean expatriate newspapers. However, the South Korean government takes a dim view of their own nationals who visit the restaurants, and warns them that they may be charged with violating the National Security Act.

The first Okryu-gwan branch in China opened in Beijing's Wangjing district in 2003; by 2010, its revenues were estimated at more than US$6,000 per day. The waitresses are graduates of the Jang Chol Gu University of Commerce or culinary schools in Pyongyang. The restaurant in Shanghai of the same name is a knock-off, staffed by Chinese citizens of Korean ethnicity. The Okryu-gwan branch in Dubai is located in the Deira area, near the Deira Clocktower. It is a joint venture with several equityholders, including an undisclosed majority local owner, along with Chinese businessman Gavin Tang. It is popular with Japanese expatriates. A branch in Kathmandu reportedly continued to operate as of early 2011, though another nearby North Korean restaurant Kumgangsan closed after its manager absconded to India with its funds and reportedly defected to South Korea. Other international branches of Okryu-gwan operate in Vietnam, Thailand, Cambodia, Laos, Mongolia, and Russia.

In 1999, a restaurant of the same name was opened in South Korea by Kim Young-baek, attracting attention in the South Korean press for its claim to be an officially contracted branch restaurant of the one in the North. A spokesman for the Pyongyang Okryu-gwan denied that any such contract existed, while Kim clarified that he had not contracted directly with the Pyongyang Okryu-gwan but rather with Chongryon. Nevertheless, the Southern Okryu-gwan, a 360-seat restaurant in Seoul, maintained several ties with the one in the North; they employed a Korean with a Japanese passport who had trained as a chef at the Pyongyang Okryu-gwan, hung a painting of the Pyongyang Okryu-gwan done by a North Korean artist on their outside wall, imported buckwheat and mung bean from the North, and even purchased utensils and tableware from the Pyongyang Okryu-gwan. Soon after they opened, they were turning away as many as 3,000 customers a day for lack of seats.

== Customers ==
Okryu-gwan is open to the general public of North Korea, but in order to eat here, they must obtain tickets from their work units; there may be a long wait for such tickets, as well as a fee, which does not cover the food itself. Foreigners who eat here will not be seated in segregated sections, but may be shown into one of the smaller rooms.

Korean War veterans who live in Pyongyang also receive free noodles at the restaurant on the anniversary of the Korean Armistice Agreement, which is celebrated as a public holiday in North Korea.

== See also ==
- Pyongyang (restaurant chain)
