= Songsin station =

Railway station in North Korea

Songsin 송신

Korean name
- Hangul: 송신역
- Hanja: 松新驛
- Revised Romanization: Songsin-yeok
- McCune–Reischauer: Songsin-yŏk

General information
- Location: P'yŏngyang; North Korea
- Coordinates: 38.9969°N 125.7923°E
- Owner: Korean State Railway

History
- Opened: after 1953

Services
Preceding station	Korean State Railway	Following station
Mirim towards Kujang Ch'ŏngnyŏn	P'yŏngdŏk Line	East P'yŏngyang towards P'yŏngyang
Location

Songsin station is a railway station located in P'yŏngyang, North Korea, on the P'yŏngdŏk Line of the Korean State Railway.

== History ==
The station was opened by the Korean State Railway after the end of the Korean War as part of the realignment of the Taedonggang–Mirim section of the P'yŏngdŏk Line.
