= Pyongyang (restaurant chain) =

North Korean restaurant chain

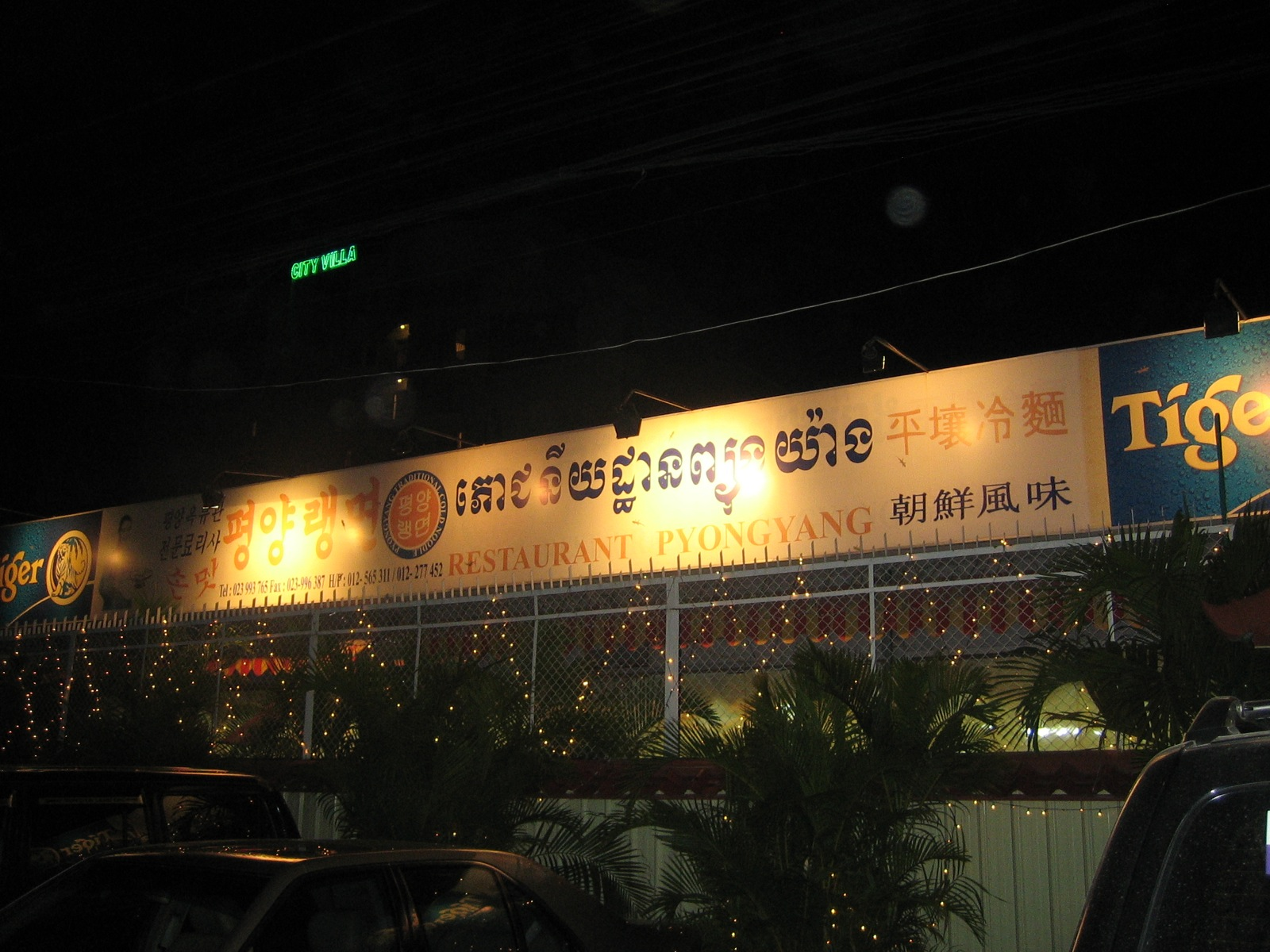
Sign for the Pyongyang Restaurant in Phnom Penh, Cambodia

Pyongyang (Korean: 평양관; MR: P'yŏngyanggwan) is a restaurant chain named after the capital of North Korea, with around 130 locations worldwide. The restaurants are owned and operated by the Haedanghwa Group.

== Locations ==
Most Pyongyang restaurants are found near the North Korean border in China, as well as in Beijing and Shanghai. Since the 2000s, the chain has been expanding into South and Southeast Asian cities including Phnom Penh, Siem Reap, Ho Chi Minh City, Hanoi, Da Nang, Vientiane, Dhaka, Jakarta, and Kuala Lumpur. There are also restaurants in Ulaanbaatar, Vladivostok, Moscow, and Kathmandu. The restaurants initially catered to the many South Korean businessmen in Southeast Asia, and have now become popular with curious tourists.

The first Western outpost of the restaurant chain was opened in Amsterdam in 2012, in the residential neighbourhood of Osdorp, along with Dutch co-owners. The menu and policies of this restaurant differed from its Asian counterparts. However, in September 2012, amid mutual accusations between the Korean staff and the Dutch partner, the restaurant closed. It reopened in December 2013 under the name Haedanghwa in a new location, but closed a year later.

The restaurant's locations in Bangkok were temporarily shut down, but were re-opened again in 2015. Similarly, their branches in Pattaya were closed down. The branch in Ho Chi Minh City closed down in 2017 and the branch in Hanoi shut down in 2020.

It was reported that a new branch was set to open in Scotland, in line with North Korean leader Kim Jong Un's interest in the country after its 2014 independence referendum, although this has been denied by North Korean officials.

In 2017, there were ~100 North Korean restaurants in China alone.

== Service ==
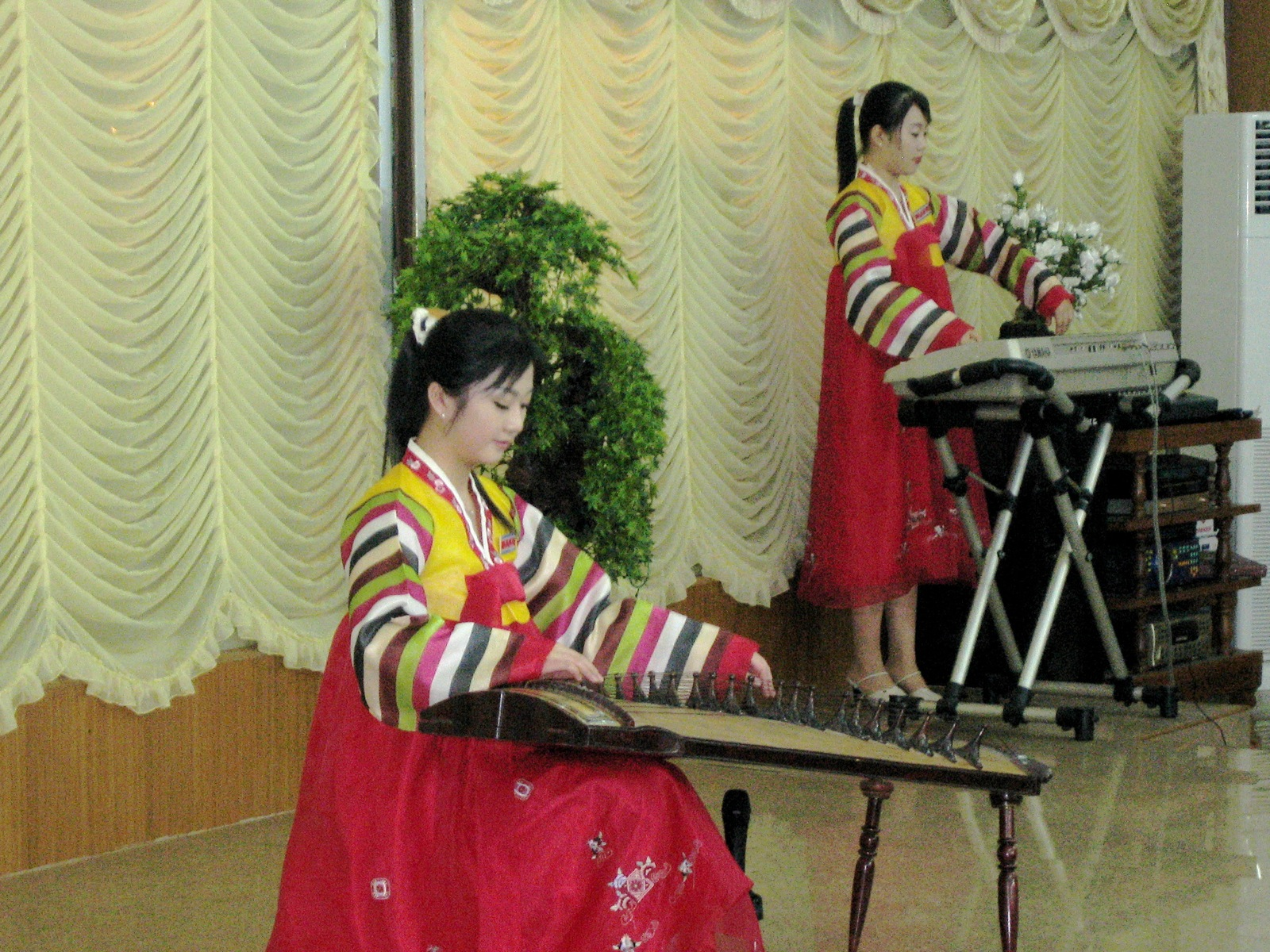
North Korean women performing at the Pyongyang Restaurant in Phnom Penh.

The restaurants serve Korean food, including kimchi dishes, Pyongyang cold noodles, barbecued cuttlefish and dog meat soup. Patrons may also buy North Korean products such as ginseng wine and an unlabelled aphrodisiac claimed to be made from bears. The prices are relatively high and in US dollars.

The staff consists of young Korean women in traditional Chosŏn-ot dress, who also perform karaoke as well as song and dance routines in the style of the North Korean Mass Games for the customers. Staff from North Korea typically work on three-year contracts, and are often highly trained graduates of arts colleges. Photography is generally not permitted inside.

== Operation ==
According to Swedish journalist Bertil Lintner, the restaurants are one of several overseas business ventures of Room 39, a North Korean government organization dedicated to acquiring and laundering foreign currency for the North Korean leadership.

North Korean defectors have reported that the restaurants are run by local middlemen, who are required to send money every year to the North Korean government. The North Korean staff, who live on the restaurant premises, are said to be thoroughly screened for political loyalty and to be closely watched by on-site North Korean security agents. In the 2000s, according to Daily NK, several attempted escapes by waitresses in China led to the closure of several restaurants and the repatriation of the staff. In 2016, Chinese authorities announced that 13 restaurant workers had defected from Pyongyang restaurants in China to South Korea.

== See also ==
- Okryugwan, a restaurant in Pyongyang founded in 1960.
