= Taedonggang-guyok =

District of Pyongyang

Taedonggang-guyŏk 대동강구역
- Guyŏk of Pyongyang

Korean transcription(s)
  - Hanja: 大同江區域
  - McCune-Reischauer: Taedonggang-guyŏk
  - Revised Romanization: Daedonggangguyeok
- Location of Taedonggang-guyok within Pyongyang
- Coordinates: 39°01′50″N 125°47′50″E
- Country: North Korea
- Direct-administered city: P'yŏngyang-Chikhalsi

Area
  - Total: 14.41 km^{2} (5.56 sq mi)

Population (2008)
  - Total: 207,081
  - Density: 14,370/km^{2} (37,220/sq mi)

- Taedonggang-guyok
- Chosŏn'gŭl: 대동강구역
- Hancha: 大同江區域
- Revised Romanization: Daedonggangguyeok
- McCune–Reischauer: Taedonggang-guyŏk

Taedonggang-guyŏk (Korean: 대동강구역), or Taedong River District, is one of the 19 guyok which constitute the city of Pyongyang, North Korea. Taedonggang-guyŏk is on the eastern bank of the Taedong River, north of Tongdaewŏn-guyŏk and west of Sadong-guyŏk (Sadong District). It was established in January 1958.

== Administrative divisions ==
Taedonggang-guyŏk is divided into 25 tong (neighbourhoods):

- Ch'ŏngryu 1-dong 청류 1동 (淸流 1洞)
- Ch'ŏngryu 2-dong 청류 2동 (淸流 2洞)
- Ch'ŏngryu 3-dong 청류 3동 (淸流 3洞)
- Munhŭng 1-dong 문흥 1동 (文興 1洞)
- Munhŭng 2-dong 문흥 2동 (文興 2洞)
- Munsu 1-dong 문수 1동 (紋繡 1洞)
- Munsu 2-dong 문수 2동 (紋繡 2洞)
- Munsu 3-dong 문수 3동 (紋繡 3洞)
- Puksu-dong 북수동 (北繡洞)
- Ongryu 1-dong 옥류 1동 (玉流 1洞)
- Ongryu 2-dong 옥류 2동 (玉流 2洞)
- Ongryu 3-dong 옥류 3동 (玉流 3洞)
- Rŭngra 1-dong 릉라 1동 (綾羅 1洞)
- Rŭngra 2-dong 릉라 2동 (綾羅 2洞)
- Sagok 1-dong 사곡 1동 (四谷 1洞)
- Sagok 2-dong 사곡 2동 (四谷 2洞)
- Soryong 1-dong 소룡 1동 (小龍 1洞)
- Soryong 2-dong 소룡 2동 (小龍 2洞)
- Taedonggang-dong 대동강동 (大洞江洞)
- Tongmun 1-dong 동문 1동 (東門 1洞)
- Tongmun 2-dong 동문 2동 (東門 2洞)
- T'apchŏ 1-dong 탑제 1동
- T'apchŏ 2-dong 탑제 2동
- T'apchŏ 3-dong 탑제 3동
- Ŭi'am-dong 의암동 (衣岩洞)

== Landmarks ==
It is home to the Pyongyang University of Music and Dance.

It is connected to Chung-guyok by the Okryu Bridge, and to Rungra Island and Moranbong-guyok by the Rungra Bridge.
