= Chongryu Bridge =

Bridge in Pyongyang, North Korea

Coordinates: 39.0446°N 125.7729°E

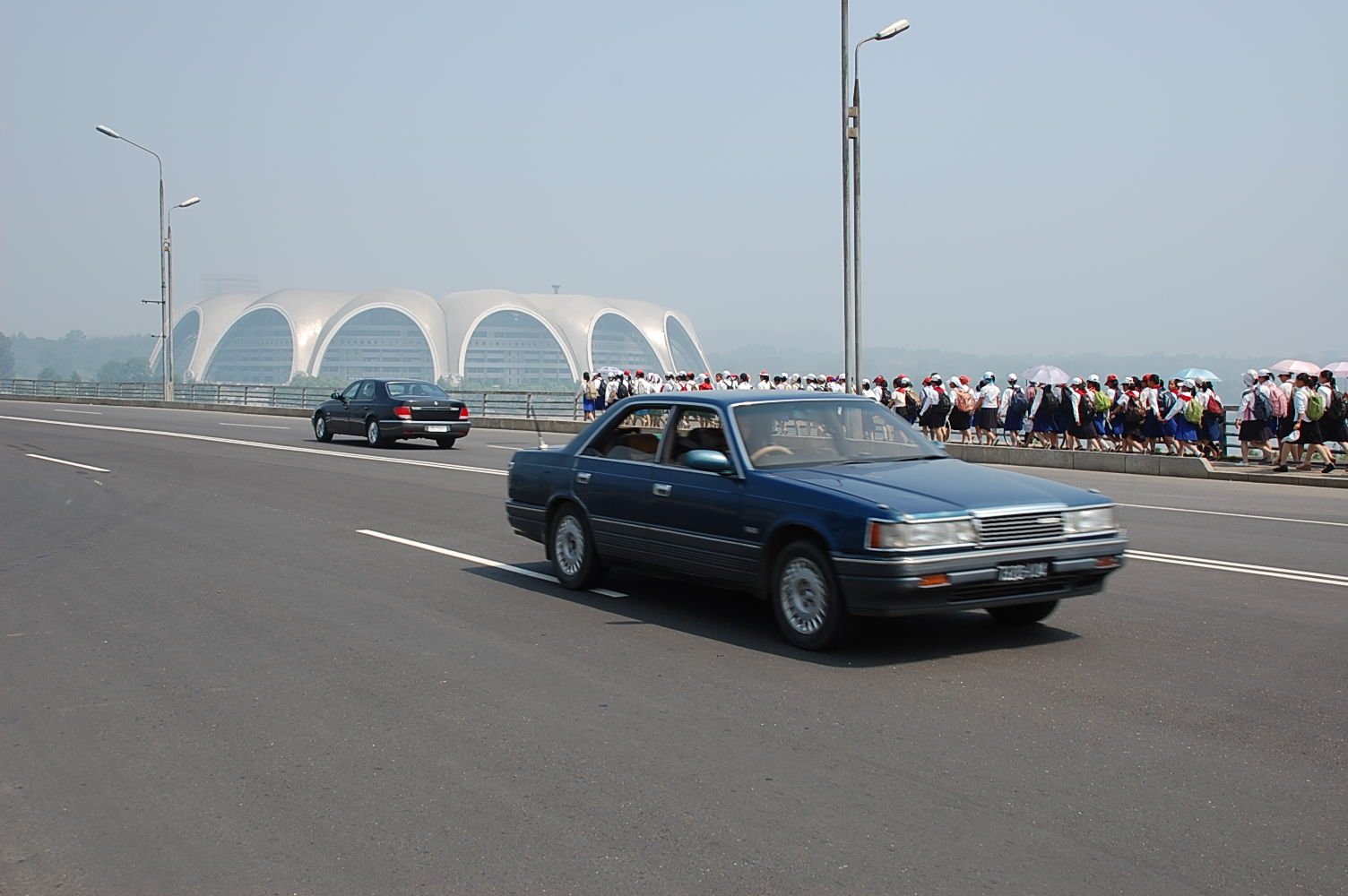
The bridge, with the May Day Stadium on the sight

The Chongryu Bridge (청류교) is one of the six major bridges in Pyongyang crossing the Taedong River. Like the Rungra Bridge (릉라교) on its south, Chongryu Bridge passes through Rungra Island.
