= Myongdang Line =

Railway line in North Korea

Myŏngdang Line

Overview
- Native name: 명당선 (明堂線)
- Status: Operational
- Owner: Chosen Government Railway (1925–1945); Korean State Railway (since 1945)
- Locale: P'yŏngyang-tŭkp'yŏlsi; North Hwanghae
- Termini: Ch'ŏngryong; Myŏngdang
- Stations: 4

Service
- Type: Heavy rail, Freight rail

History
- Opened: 1 November 1925

Technical
- Line length: 19.2 km (11.9 mi)
- Number of tracks: Single track
- Track gauge: 1,435 mm (4 ft 8 1/2 in) standard gauge
- Electrification: 3000 V DC Catenary

- Myongdang Line
- Hangul: 명당선
- Hanja: 明堂線
- RR: Myeongdangseon
- MR: Myŏngdangsŏn

The Myŏngdang Line is an electrified railway line of the Korean State Railway in P'yŏngyang and in North Hwanghae Province, North Korea, running from Ch'ŏngryong on the P'yŏngdŏk Line to Myŏngdang.

== History ==
The Myŏngdang Line, together with Ch'ŏngryong Station, were opened by the Chosen Government Railway on 1 November 1925.

== Services ==
In addition to freight trains serving the Sangwŏn Cement Complex and its refractories plant at Myŏngdang, there are also two pairs of local passenger trains, 702/703 and 704/705, that operate between East P'yŏngyang on the P'yŏngdŏk Line and Myŏngdang.

== Route ==
A yellow background in the "Distance" box indicates that section of the line is not electrified.

Distance (km)		Station Name		Former Name		
Total	S2S	Transcribed	Chosŏn'gŭl (Hanja)	Transcribed	Chosŏn'gŭl (Hanja)	Connections
0.0	0.0	Ch'ŏngryong	청룡 (靑龍)			P'yŏngdŏk Line
6.2	6.2	Rihyŏn	리현 (梨峴)			
11.0	4.8	Taewŏn	대원 (大園)			
19.2	8.2	Myŏngdang	명당 (明堂)			
		Sangwŏn	상원 (祥原)			
