= Mirim Horse Riding Club =

Horse farm located in North Korea

Coordinates: 39.014°N 125.847°E

- 미림승마구락부
- Mirim Equestrian Club
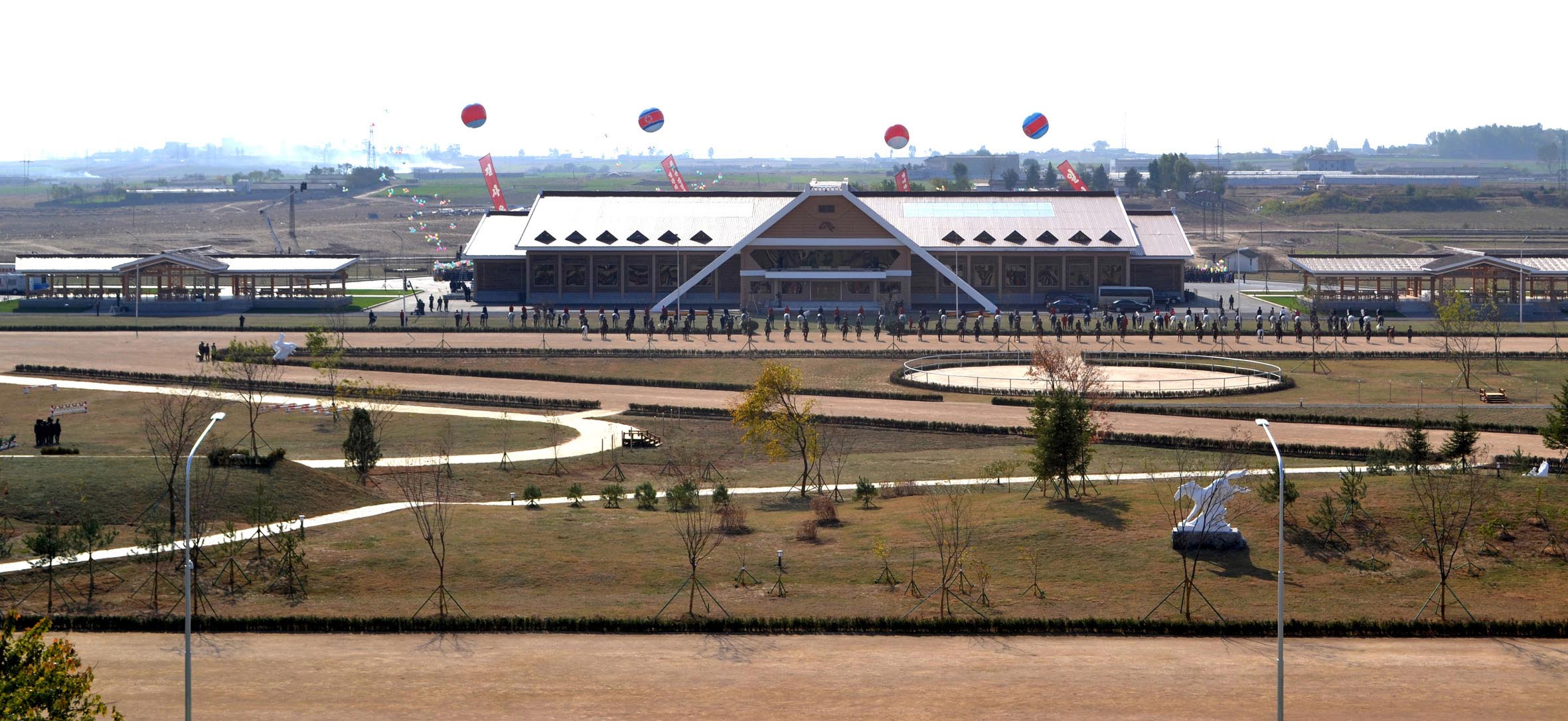
- Mirim Horse Riding Club
- Interactive map of Mirim Horse Riding Club
- Location: Mirim-dong, Sadong District, Pyongyang, North Korea
- Owner: Workers' Party of Korea
- Surface: Horse riding facilities

Construction
- Built: 25 October 2013
- Opened: 15 November 2013

Mirim Horse Riding Club (Korean: 미림승마구락부), also known as the Mirim Equestrian Club, is a horse farm located in Mirim-dong, Sadong District, Pyongyang, North Korea. The horse farm was formerly a training ground for the 534th Cavalry Company of the Korean People's Army.

== History ==
In November 2012, Kim Jong Un suggested that the training ground should be converted into a riding club. Construction of the club started in May 2013 and was completed on October 25 of the same year, and was officially opened on November 15.

In 2023, reports indicated that the club was being promoted as part of efforts to reopen North Korea to foreign tourists following the COVID-19 pandemic.

== Facilities ==
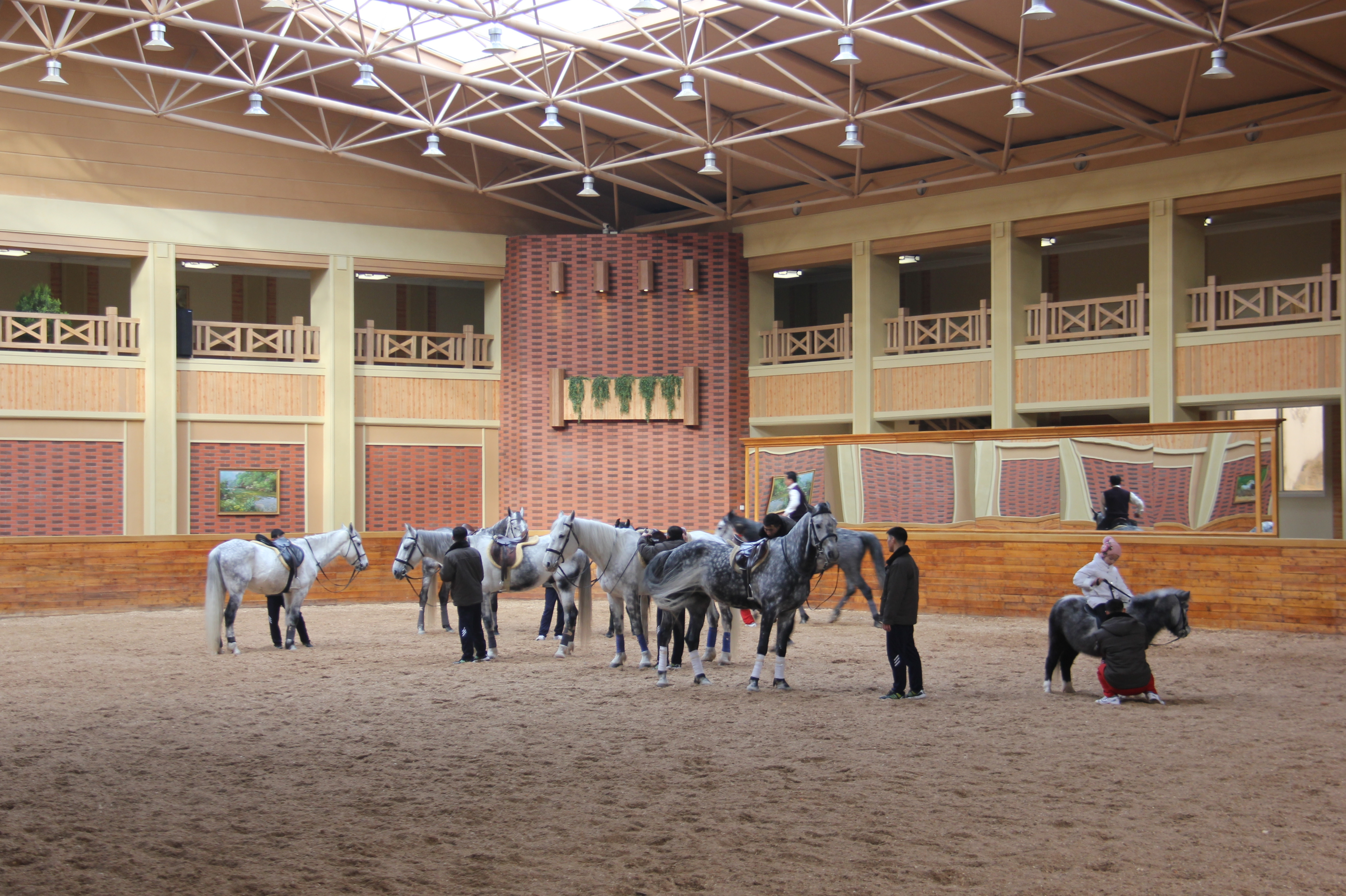
indoor training ground of the Mirim Riding Club

According to reports, the Mirim Horse Riding Club has an outdoor track, an indoor training ground, a horse riding knowledge popularization room, a fatigue recovery center, a veterinary hospital and a breeding research institute. It also houses a horse racing arcade, a restaurant, a photo studio, and souvenir shops.

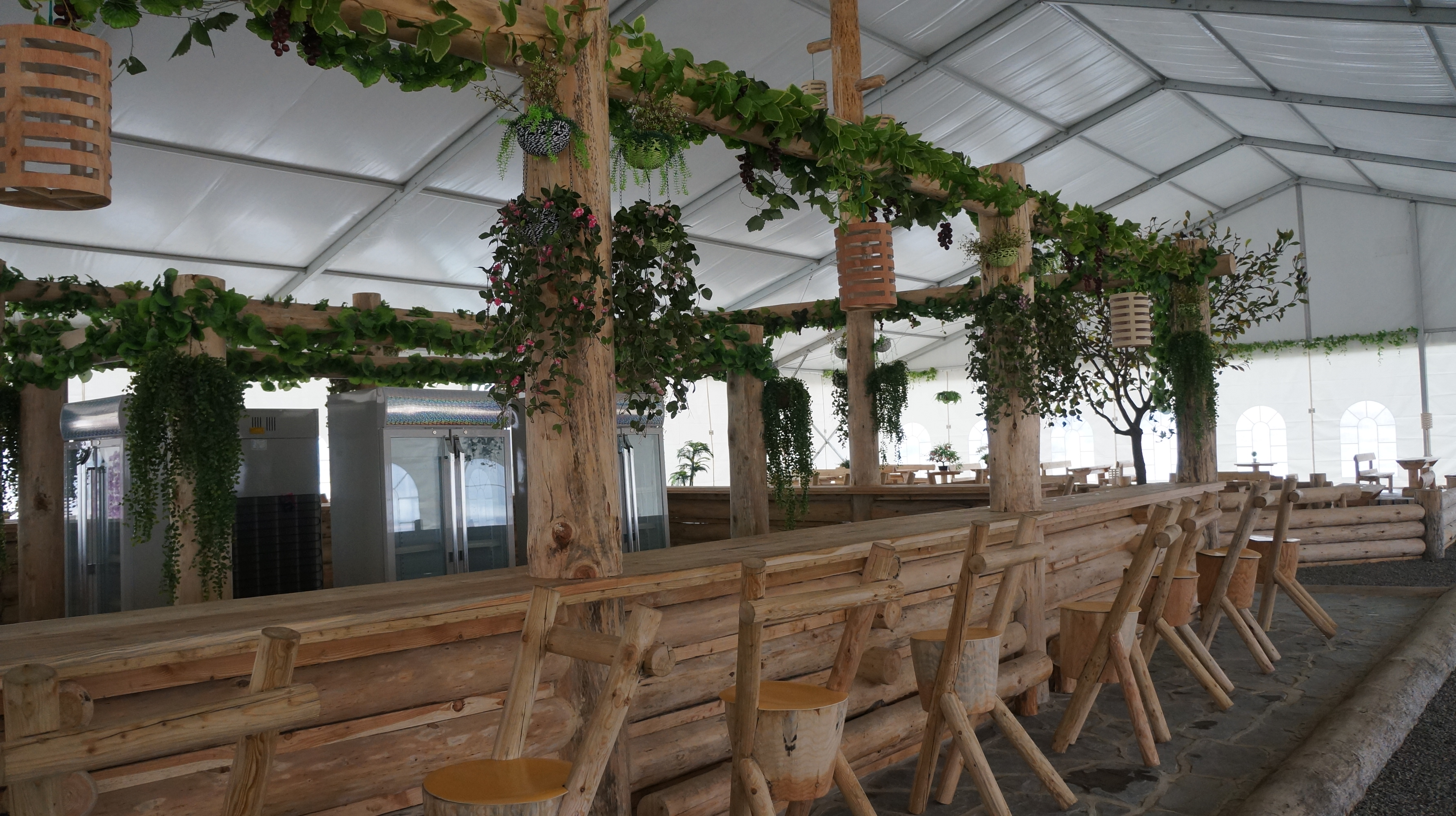
Indoor Summer Tent at Mirim Horse Riding Club

It covers an area of 627,000 square meters and a building area of 44,000 square meters. In addition, the club has 120 horses 67 Orlov Trotters from Russia and 53 domestic horses called Gwan Gok from Rason, and employs more than 60 horse riding trainers. The club charges very high fees. In 2013, locals had to pay 100,000 North Korean won per hour to ride horses in the indoor training ground and 100,000 won per hour for the outdoor track, while overseas tourists had to pay 36 US dollars per hour. The club allows tourists to place bets, so according to Reuters, the main reason Kim Jong Un established the equestrian club was to earn foreign exchange.

In 2013, the club launched its own taxi service. The taxi logo was first believed to be of Koryolink, but later it was found to be that of the club and not Koryolink. There is also a bus route that connects the Pyongyang Department Store No. 1 and the Mirim Horse Riding Club.

== Access and usage ==
According to a report by Daily NK, the Mirim Horse Riding Club primarily attracts officials from Pyongyang, wealthy individuals, and their families, while ordinary residents see it as an entertainment facility for the elites.

It also reported that residents outside of Pyongyang must obtain official approval and travel permits in advance and are required to pay for their own accommodation. Due to the financial burdens, visits for horseback riding are considered uncommon among the general population.

== Gallery ==
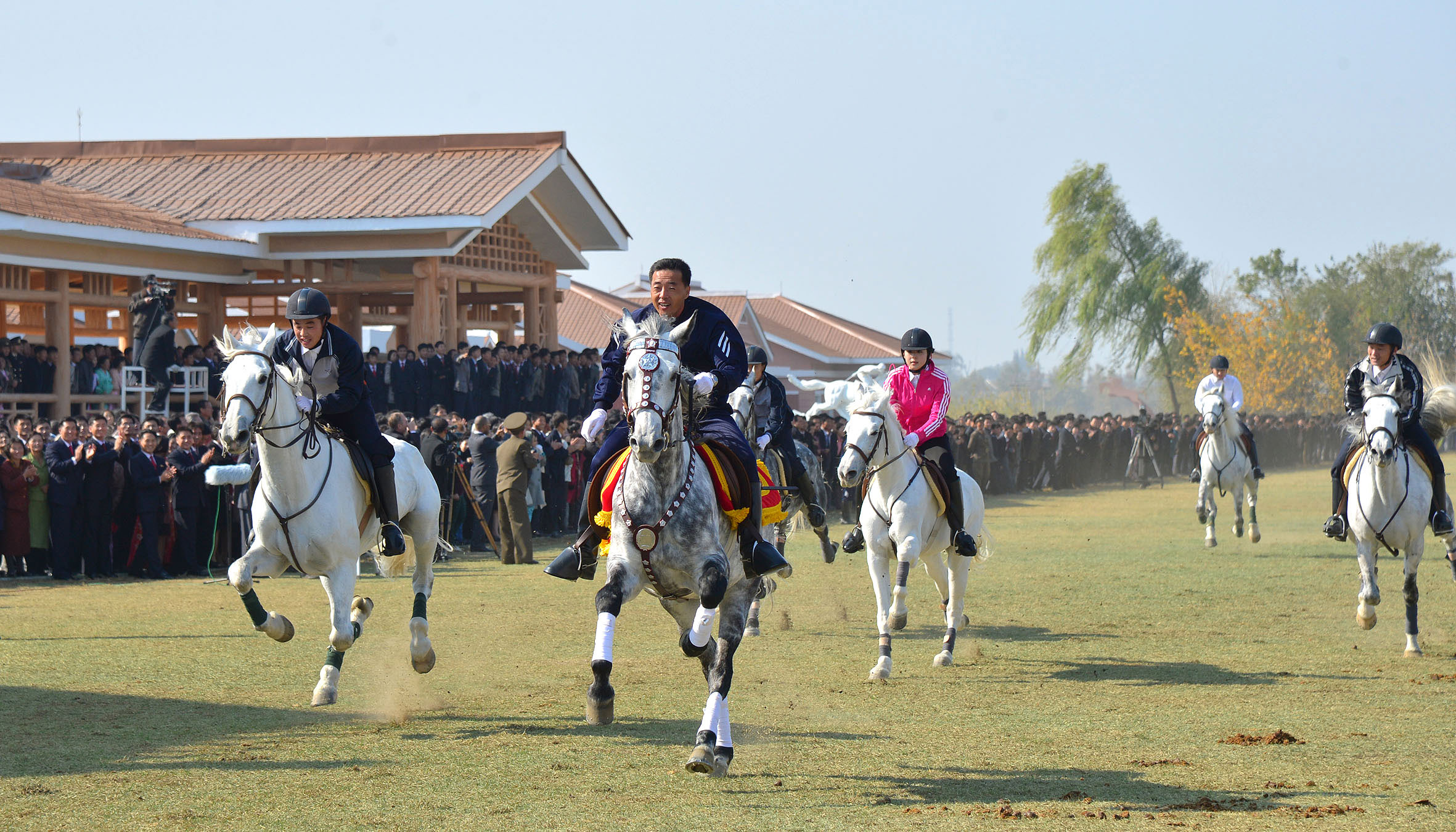
Horse riding at the club

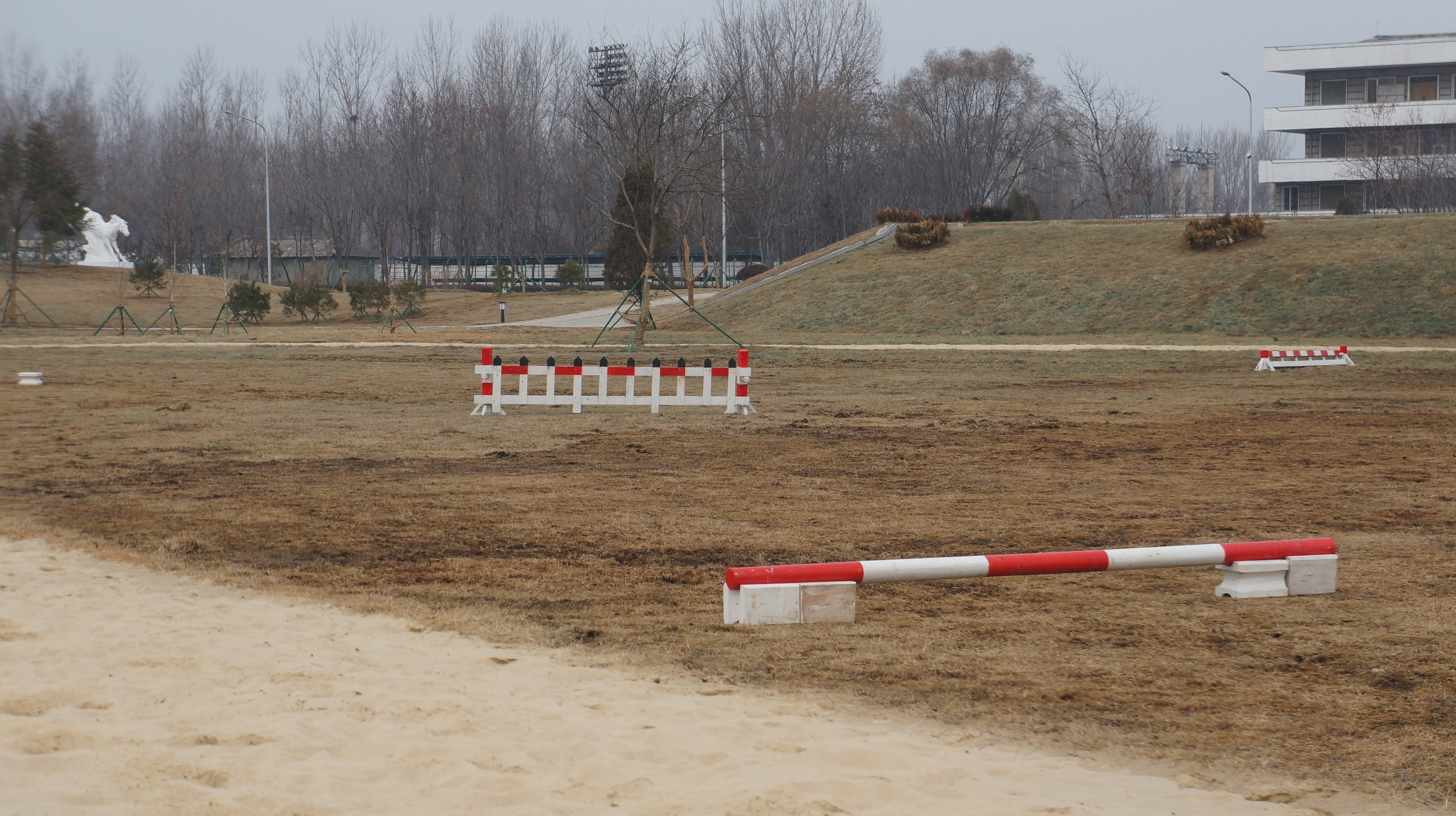
Jump Training

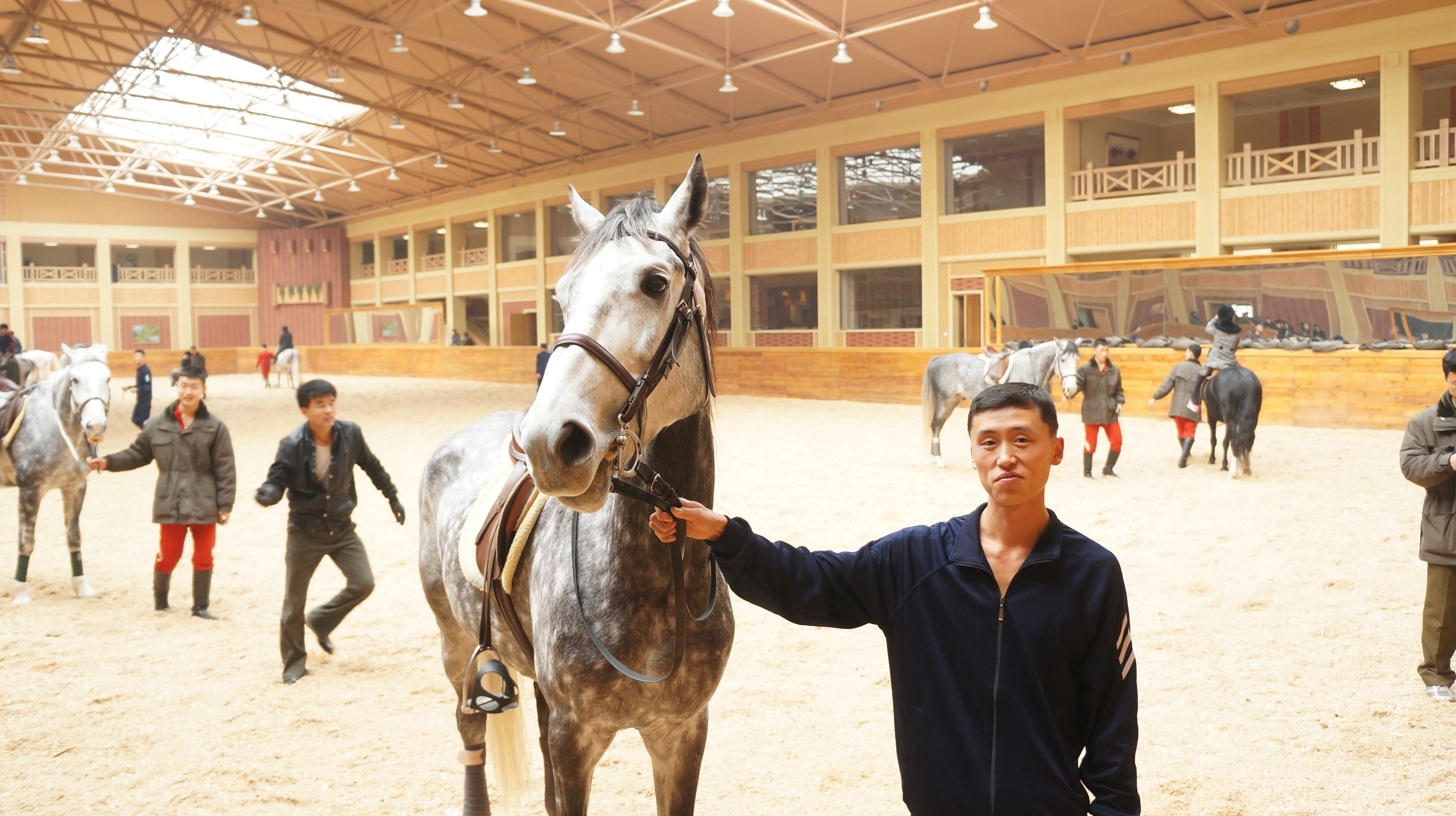
Sanmae, 8 year old Orlov Trotter

== See also ==
- Tourism in North Korea
- Pyongyang Ostrich Farm
- Wonsan Kalma Coastal Tourist Area
