= Sadong-guyok =

District of Pyongyang, North Korea

Sadong-guyŏk 사동구역
- Guyŏk of Pyongyang

Korean transcription(s)
  - Hanja: 寺洞區域
  - McCune-Reischauer: Sadong-guyŏk
  - Revised Romanization: Sadongguyeok
- Location of Sadong-guyok within Pyongyang
- Coordinates: 38°59′N 125°54′E
- Country: North Korea
- Direct-administered city: P'yŏngyang-Chikhalsi

Area
  - Total: 124.8 km^{2} (48.2 sq mi)

Population (2008)
  - Total: 140,869
  - Density: 1,129/km^{2} (2,923/sq mi)

- Sadong-guyok
- Hangul: 사동구역
- Hanja: 寺洞區域
- Revised Romanization: Sadongguyeok
- McCune–Reischauer: Sadong-guyŏk

Sadong-guyŏk, or Sadong District, is one of the 19 guyok which constitute the city of Pyongyang, North Korea. It is on the eastern bank of the Taedong River, and the mouth of the Nam River. It is north of Ryŏkp'o-guyŏk (Ryokpho District), east of Taedonggang-guyŏk (Taedonggang District) and north east of Tongdaewŏn-guyŏk. It was established in September 1959.

== Administrative divisions ==
Sadong-guyŏk is divided into 13 tong (neighbourhoods) and 6 ri (villages):

- Changch'ŏn-dong 장천동 (將泉洞):named after a fountain that locals believe gives the strength of a military general
- Hyuam-dong 휴암동 (休岩洞)
- Mirim-dong 미림동 (美林洞)
- Namsan-dong 남산동 (南山洞)
- Samgol-dong 삼골동
- Songhwa 1-dong 송화 1동 (松華 1洞)
- Songhwa 2-dong 송화 2동 (松華 2洞)
- Songsin 1-dong 송신 1동 (松新 1洞)
- Songsin 2-dong 송신 2동 (松新 2洞)
- Songsin 3-dong 송신 3동 (松新 3洞)
- Sŏkchŏng-dong 석정동 (石井洞)
- Turu 1-dong 두루 1동 (豆樓 1洞)
- Turu 2-dong 두루 2동 (豆樓 2洞)
- Oryu-ri 오류리 (五柳里)
- Rihyŏl-ri 리현리 (梨峴里):The name means pear valley village because the village was located under a valley with a lot of pear trees.
- Taewŏl-ri 대원리 (大園里)
- Tongch'ang-ri 동창리 (東倉里):named after a storage at the east of the capital pyongyang.
- Tŏktong-ri 덕동리 (德洞里)

== Economy ==
- Taedonggang Brewing Company is located in this district.

== Culture ==
- Mirim Horse Riding Club is located in the Mirim-dong of the district.
