= Rŭngrado =

Island in the Taedong River, North Korea

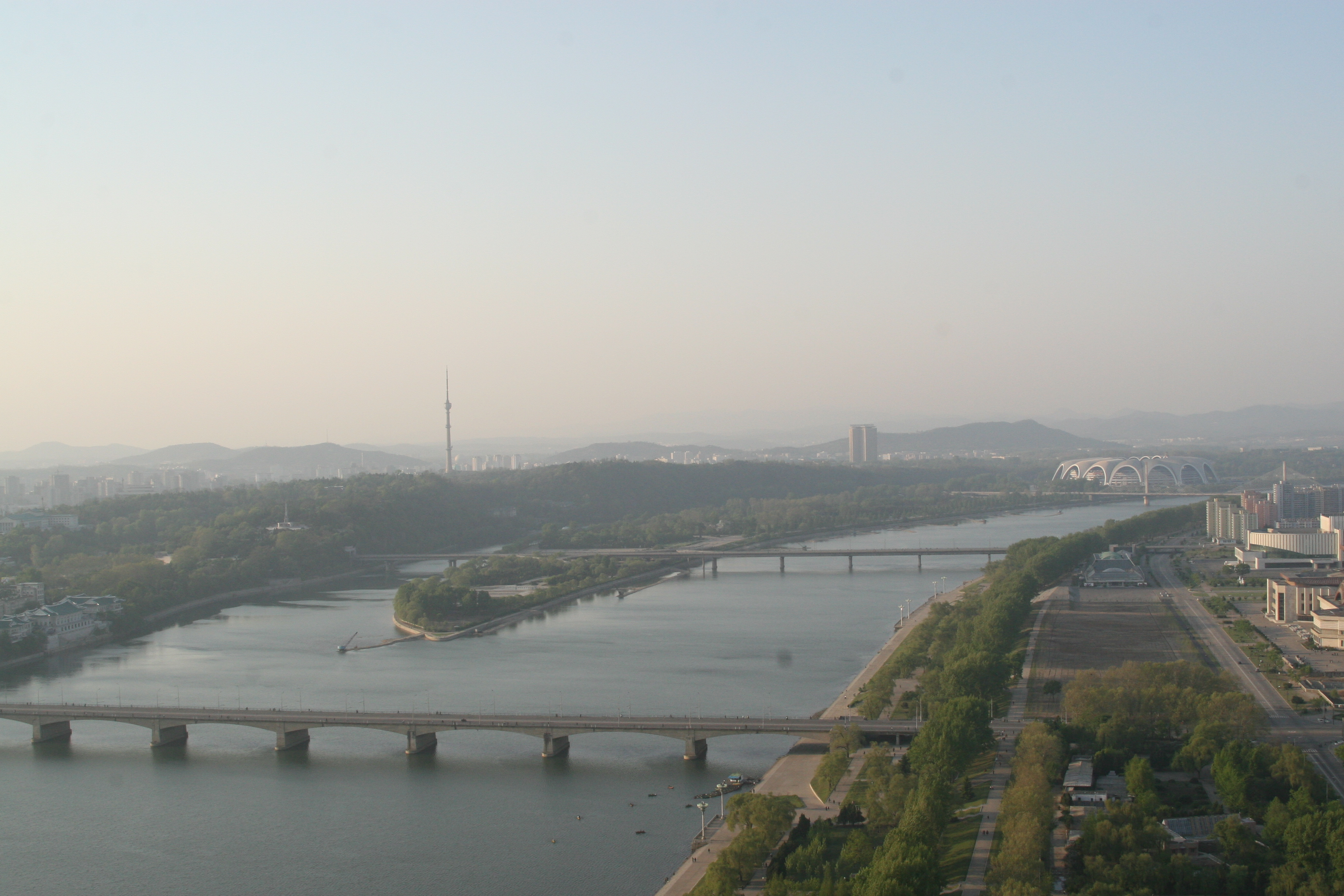

- Location within North Korea

Geography
- Coordinates: 39°02′40″N 125°46′10″E
- Area: 1.3 km^{2} (0.50 sq mi)

Administration
- North Korea

Korean name
- Hangul: 릉라도
- Hanja: 綾羅島
- RR: Reungnado
- MR: Rŭngnado

South Korean name
- Hangul: 능라도
- Hanja: 綾羅島
- RR: Neungnado
- MR: Nŭngnado

Rungra Island (Korean: 릉라도) is an island in Pyongyang, North Korea, located in the middle of the Taedong River. Its total area is 1.3 square kilometres (0.50 sq mi). The Chongryu Bridge on the north side and the Rungra Bridge on the south side connect the island to the rest of Pyongyang. Some of the Eight Views of Pyongyang can be seen from the island.

Recreational facilities on the island include the Rungrado 1st of May Stadium. The Rungra People's Pleasure Ground, which opened in 2012, includes a dolphin exhibit, volleyball and basketball courts, and a wading pool.
