= Buddhist temples in Korea =

Places of worship for Korean Buddhists

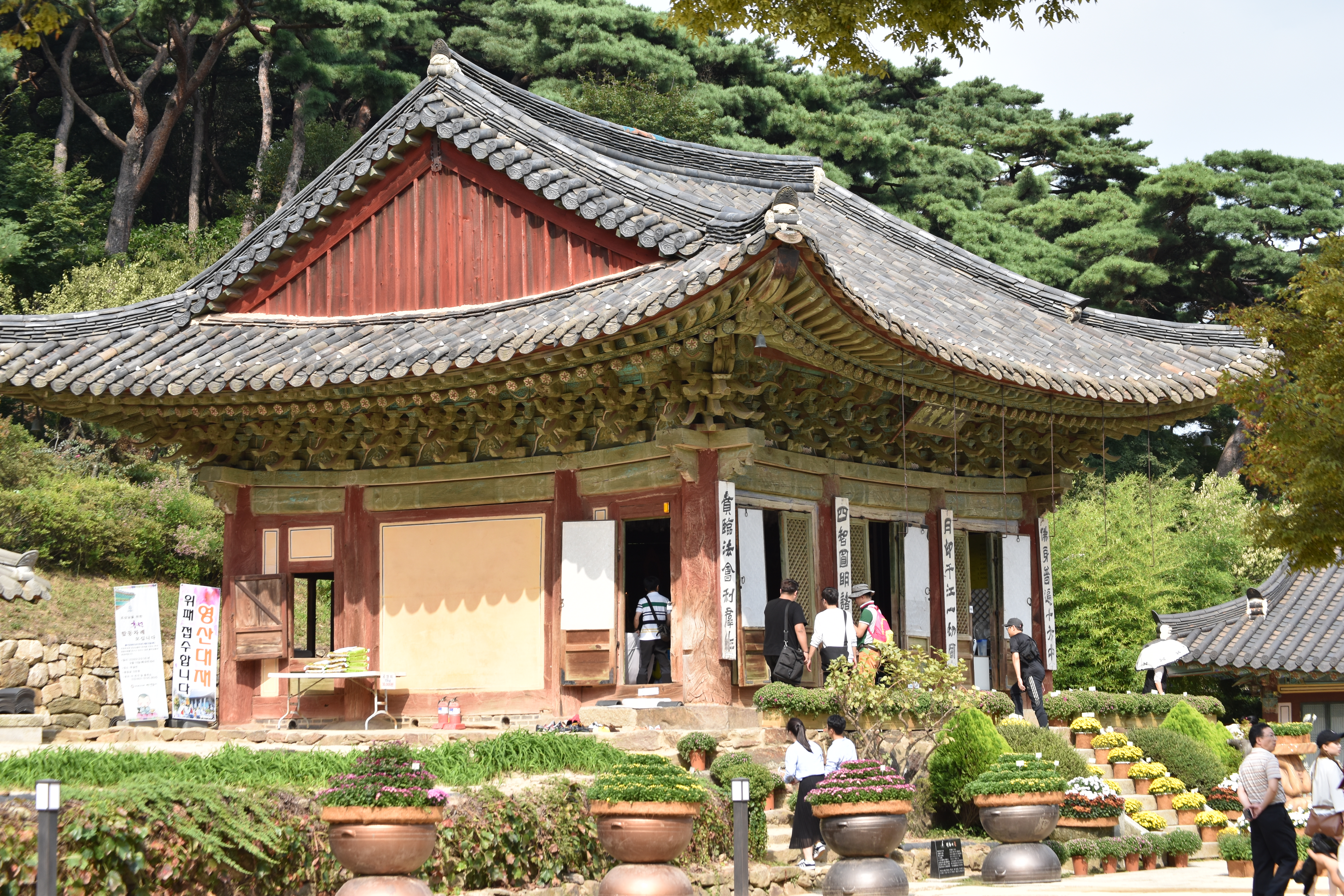
Jeondeungsa, built in 381, is the oldest extant Korean Buddhist temple.

Buddhist temples, called sachal (Korean: 사찰; Hanja: 寺刹), jeol (절), or garam (가람; 伽藍) in Korean, are an important part of Korean architecture. Buddhism was introduced to Korea in the 4th century and the earliest temples were established in Goguryeo in 375. Korean temple architecture developed under the influence of Chinese temples while acquiring distinctive forms over time. Temples of the Three Kingdoms period of Korea had pagoda-and-hall structures while those of Unified Silla had double pagoda structures. Temples expanded in scale and function during the Goryeo dynasty but policies of the Joseon dynasty restricting Buddhism pushed many temples into mountains. Many temples suffered destruction during the Korean War but were subsequently restored. Today, there are approximately 20,000 temples in South Korea and 64 in North Korea. Several Korean temples are designated as UNESCO World Cultural Heritage.

== Names ==
Most Korean temples have names ending in -sa (사; 寺), which means "monastery" in Sino-Korean. Hermitages (small temples attached to larger temples) have names ending in -am (암; 庵).

== History and characteristics ==
When Buddhism was transmitted from India to China, Indian temples, a complex of sangharama and stupas, became the architectural model for Chinese temples. During the Han dynasty when Buddhism was first introduced to China, there were no Buddhist buildings for Indian missionaries, so they were housed in Honglusi (鴻臚寺), a government office. Also, multi-story wooden watchtowers originally built for defensive purposes were repurposed as pagodas, leading to the formation of Chinese-style temple structure. This layout was later transmitted to the Korean Peninsula.

=== Three Kingdoms period ===
In 372 (second year of the reign of Sosurim of Goguryeo), Goguryeo adopted Buddhism from Former Qin. The first Korean Buddhist temples are Chomunsa (초문사; 肖門寺) and Ibullansa (이불란사; 伊弗蘭寺) built in 375. Goguryeo temples typically have a "one pagoda three main halls" structure with buildings surrounding an octagonal multi-story wooden pagoda. This layout is thought to have influenced Asuka-dera of Japan.

In 384 (first year of the reign of King Chimnyu), Baekje adopted Buddhism from Eastern Jin. The first Buddhist temple of Baekje is Bulgapsa built in 385. In 538, King Seong introduced Buddhism to Japan by sending Buddhist books and sculptures. Baekje temples mostly follow a "single pagoda" layout where the gate, pagoda, main hall, and lecture hall are arranged in a straight line with corridors (회랑) surrounding the complex. This layout is thought to have influenced Shitennō-ji of Japan. Mireuksa is a notable example of Baekje temples.

Through the martyrdom of Ichadon in 527 (14th year of the reign of King Beopheung), Buddism was popularized in Silla. The first Buddhist temple in Silla is Heungnyunsa (흥륜사; 興輪寺). Hwangnyongsa is a notable example of Silla temples.

=== Unified Silla ===
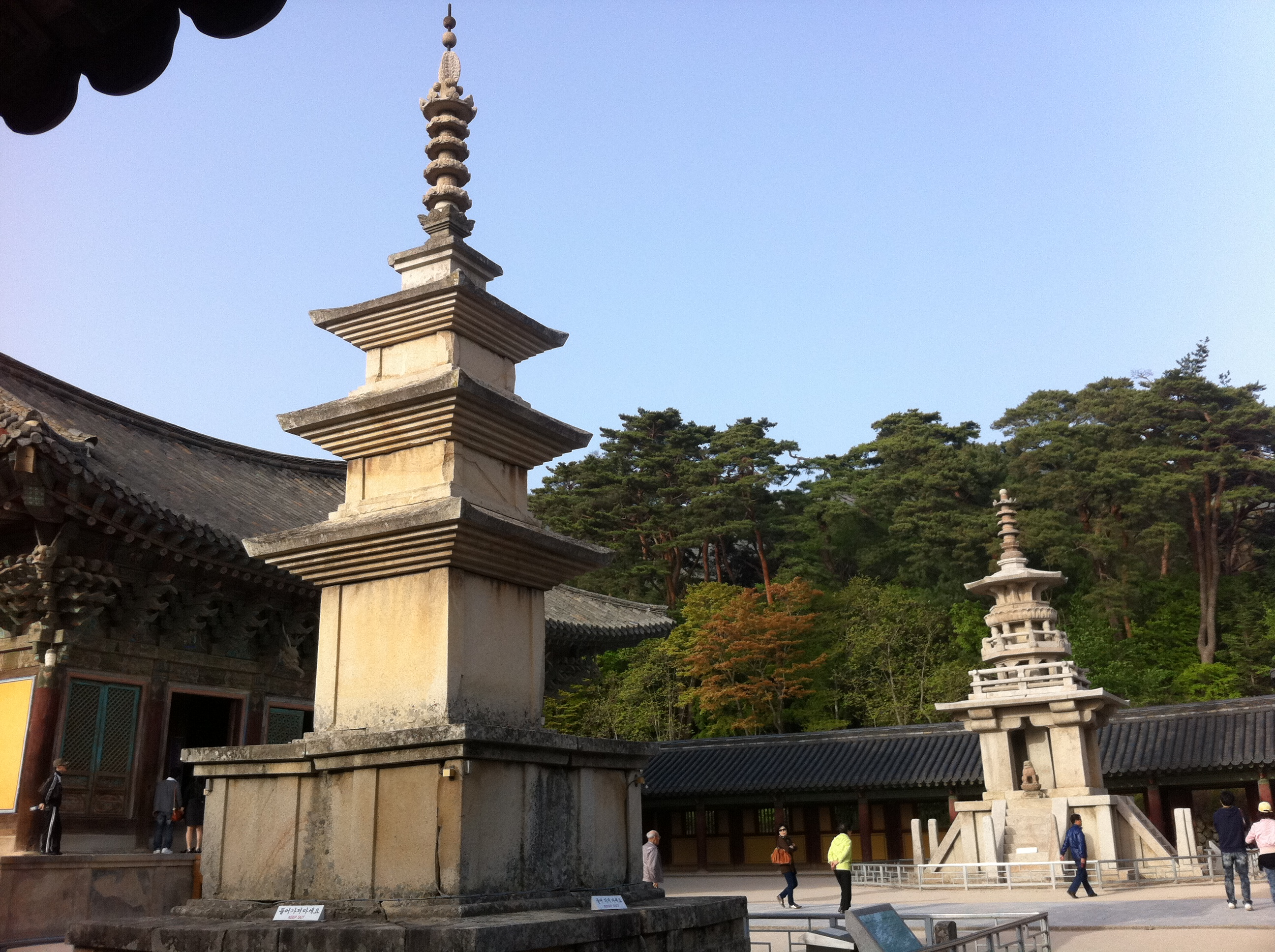
Dabotap and Seokgatap of Bulguksa show a "double pagoda" structure.

In Unified Silla, Buddhism was promoted nationally and divided into various sects. Temples began to be built in mountains to combine nature and Buddhism so corridors turned into fences (담장). The "double pagoda" structure which places a pair of pagodas on the left and right sides of the main hall emerged in the 7th century. In the mid 8th century, the two pagodas began to be built in different forms, an example being Dabotap and Seokgatap of Bulguksa. Also, bells such as Bell of King Seongdeok began to be made in the mid 8th century. Gameunsa and Bulguksa are notable examples of Unified Silla temples.

=== Goryeo ===
After founding Goryeo, King Taejo built 10 temples in Gaegyeong, its capital, and held palgwanhoe, a national Buddhist ritual, to harmonize regions and Buddhist sects divided during the Later Three Kingdoms Period. Goryeo also promoted Buddhism through policies such as seunggwa, a government exam to select high-ranking monks. Within this context, temples expanded beyond their religious functions to take on broader social and economic roles. Spaces for storing ritual tools and hosting guests increased to accommodate large-scale Buddhist ceremonies. Buddhist halls were further specialized according to deity of worship such as daeungjeon (building enshrining Buddha) and gwaneumjeon (building enshrining Gwanseeum Bosal). Seon Buddhism led to the development of monks' quarters and lecture halls for spiritual practice. As a result, worship spaces were divided into multiple zones with each zone having a main hall surrounded by subsidiary buildings. Meanwhile, Tibetan Buddhism was introduced during the 13th-century invasion of the Yuan dynasty, which influenced Goryeo Buddhist architecture such as Gyeongcheonsa Pagoda. Seongjusa, first built in the Baekje dynasty, is a notable example of temples which flourished in Goryeo.

=== Joseon ===
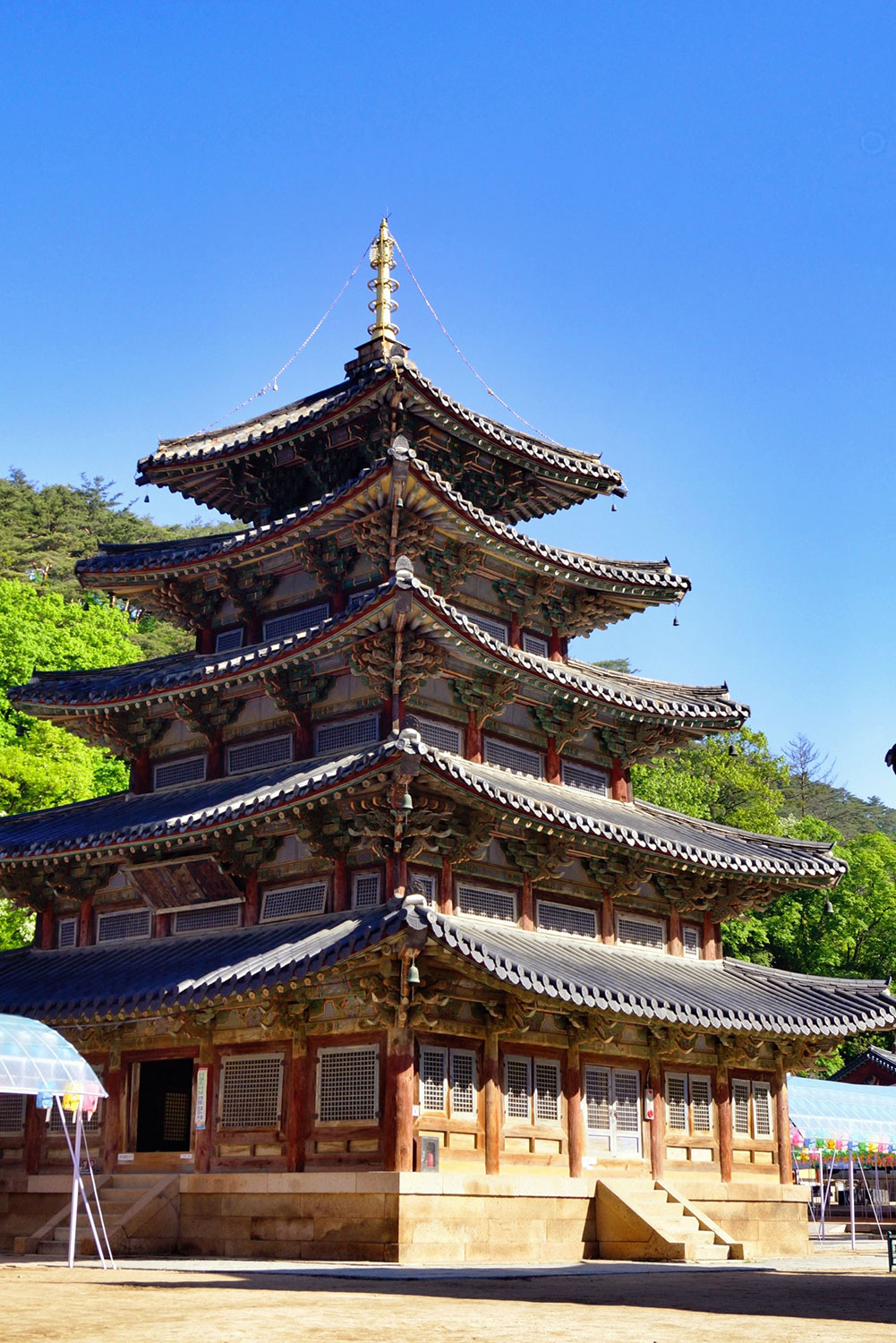
Palsangjeon of Beopjusa was rebuilt after Imjin War.

As Joseon was a Confucian state, policies suppressing Buddhism were implemented. In the 16th century, monks were prohibited from entering the capital, which restricted the construction and operation of temples within cities. Temples expelled from the city constructed buildings using the slopes of mountains and pagodas became smaller or disappeared. Nevertheless, the religious character of Buddhism and its beliefs about the afterlife did not disappear even by late Joseon. For example, King Sejo personally supported Buddhism by rebuilding Naksansa.

After the Imjin War, Buddhism was revived outside of Seoul and large Buddhist buildings such as palsangjeon of Beopjusa were built. This is because regulations on Buddhism were lifted after the efforts of monk soldiers and commoners turned to Buddhism from Confucianism which does not address death. Buddhism in late Joseon incorporated various religious elements: behind daeungjeon, buildings dedicated to Bodhisattva such as gwaneumjeon were placed and further in the back stood buildings enshrining indigenous gods such as sansingak.

=== Modern era ===
During the Korean War, 100 temples were destroyed in South Korea and 355 in North Korea. Most temples were restored through efforts of monks and believers in South Korea while only temples with high cultural value were restored under government leadership in North Korea. Temples built in the modern era have multi-story buildings due to spatial constraint and are equipped with culture facilities such as bookstores.

== Types ==
There are roughly three types of temples based on location. The flatland type (평지가람형) is usually located in the capital and have majestic buildings over a large area. Wondang (원당; 願堂; lit. 'wish house') or national temples of the royal court fall into this category and have a great influence on the popularization of Buddhism because of the convenience of transportation. The mountain land type (산지가람형) is designed to be suitable for practicing asceticism and is based on the influence of Seon Buddhism and feng shui that came into the late Silla period. Most temples in Korea are of this type due to philosophical reasons: mountain worship, protecting the country, and anti-secularism. The grotto type (석굴가람형) functions as a place of prayer.

== Typical layout ==
A typical Korean temple consists of the following elements:

- Iljumun (일주문; 一柱門; lit. 'one-pillar gate'): First gate of the temple. Its name originated from the pillars being in one line.
- Sacheonwangmun (사천왕문; 四天王門): Also called Cheonwangmun. Second gate of the temple. It is constructed to protect the temple and make visitors have the idea that all evil spirits have been eliminated by the Four Heavenly Kings.
- Burimun (불이문; 不二門): Last of the three gates leading to the temple. It means that truth is not two. In some temples, a pavilion is built after sacheonwangmun to replace the gate.
- Gangdang (강당; 講堂): Building used for lectures and sermons.
- Beopdang (법당; 法堂): Also called buljeon (불전; 佛殿) or geumdang (금당; 金堂). Buildings that worship Buddha and Bodhisattva. One temple had one beopdang in the Three Kingdoms period but began to have multiple beopdang from the Northern and Southern States period.
  - Daeungjeon (대웅전; 大雄殿) enshrines Sakyamuni. Also called daeungbojeon (대웅보전) to show respect. It is located at the center of the temple and often also houses Manjushri and Samantabhadra.
  - Geungnakjeon (극락전; 極樂殿) (극락전) enshrines Amitābha.
  - Gwaneumjeon (관음전; 觀音殿) enshrines Gwanseeum Bosal.
- Seungdang (승당; 僧堂): Building where monks live and practice asceticism.
- Jonggak (종각; 鐘閣) – bell tower
- Pagoda
- Myeongbujeon (명부전; 冥府殿) – judgment hall, housing an image of the bodhisattva Kshitigarbha (지장, 地藏) and depictions of the Buddhist hell
- Nahanjeon (나한전; 羅漢殿): Also called eungjinjeon (응진전; 應眞殿). Building enshrining Buddha and 16 Arhats.
- Sansingak (산신각; 山神閣) enshrines Sansin (mountain god).
  - Samseonggak (삼성각; 三聖閣) enshrines Sansin, Chilseongsin (Big Dipper), and Dokseong.
- Hermitage (암자; 庵子)

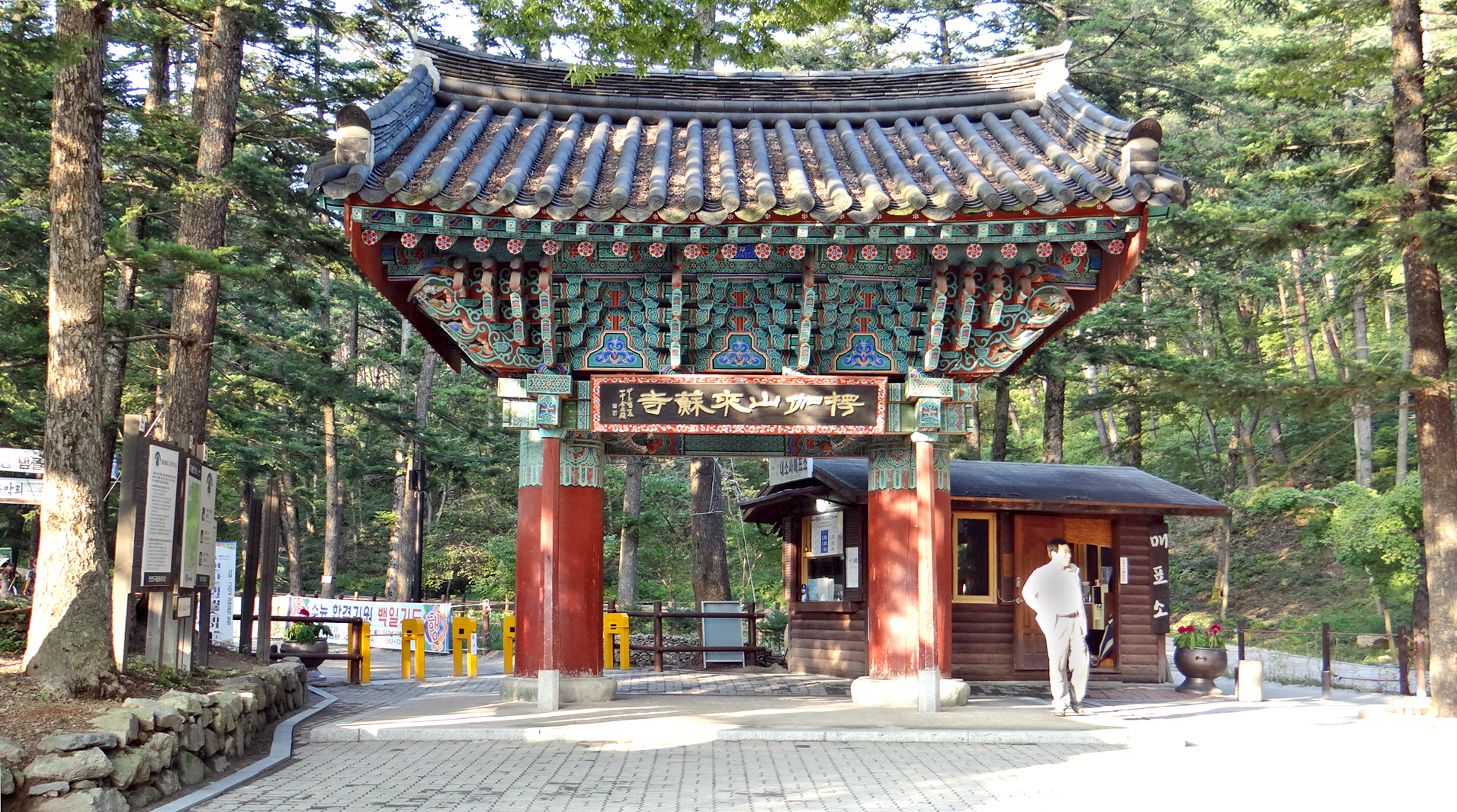
Iljumun of Naesosa

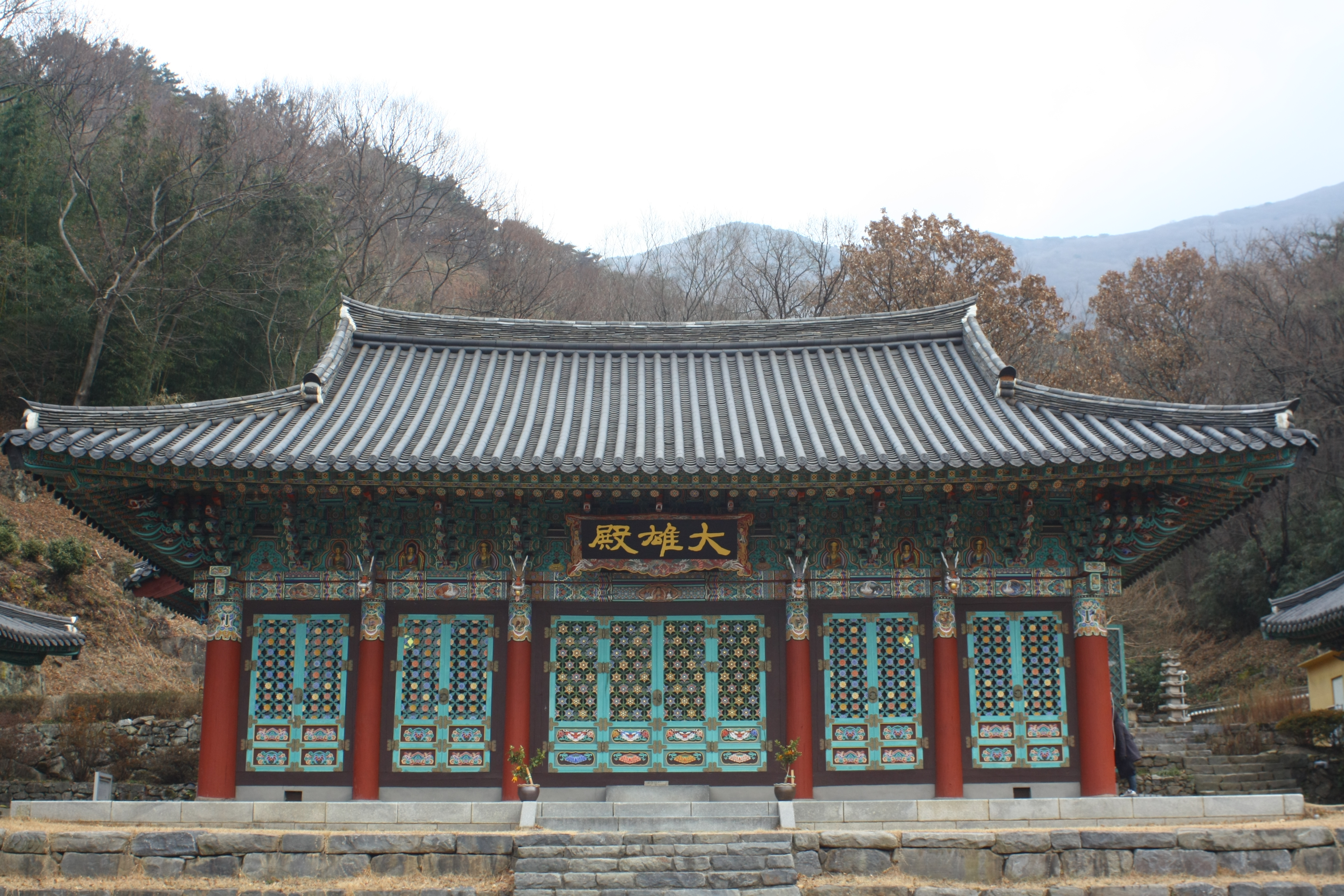
Daeungjeon of Jeungsimsa

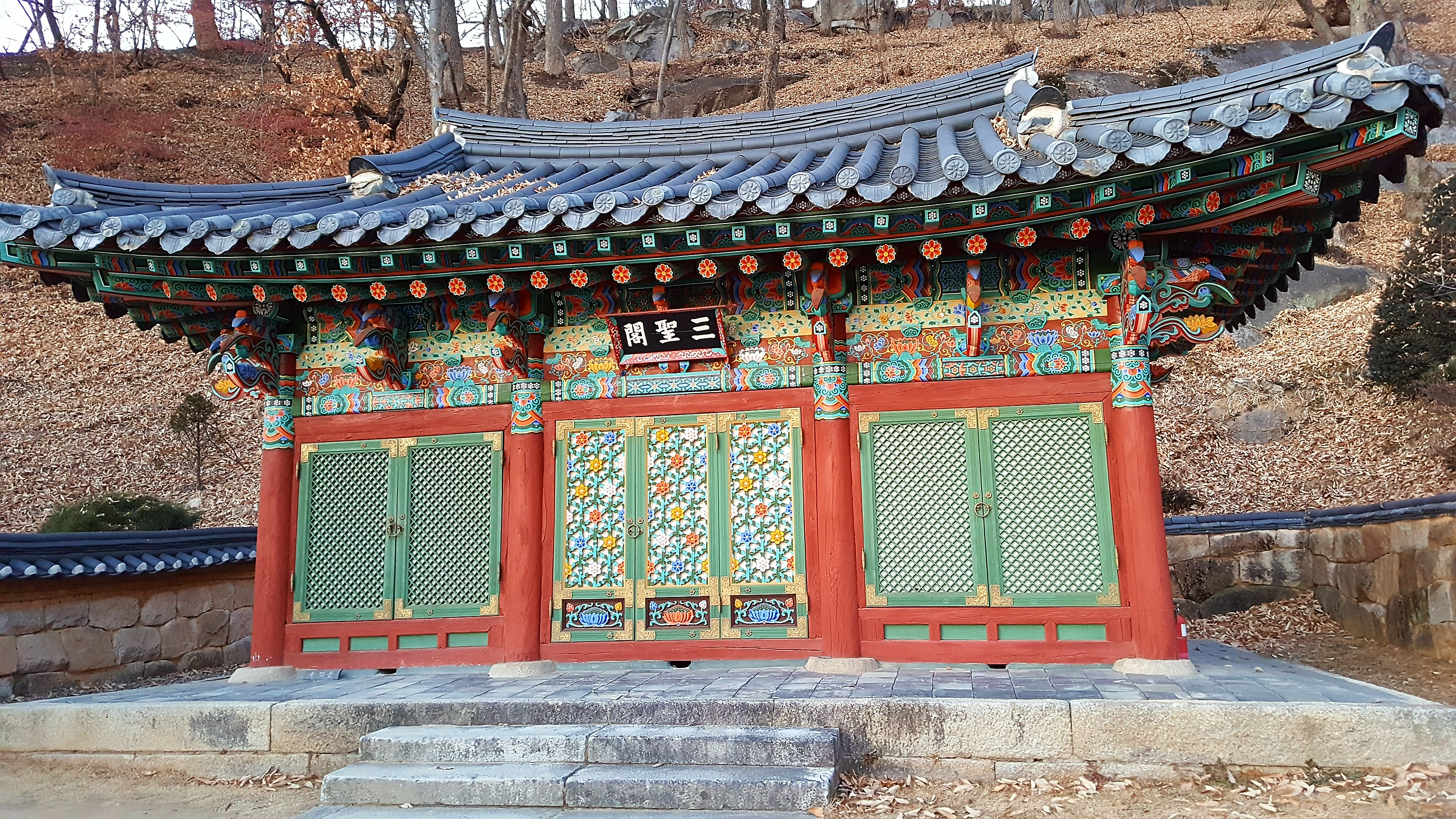
Samseonggak of Buseoksa

Typical layout

== Temples in North Korea ==
As of 2004, there are 64 temples in North Korea. Many of them are preserved primarily as cultural relics rather than active religious centers. Many temples were destroyed in the Korean War and some of them such as Sogwangsa have been rebuilt.

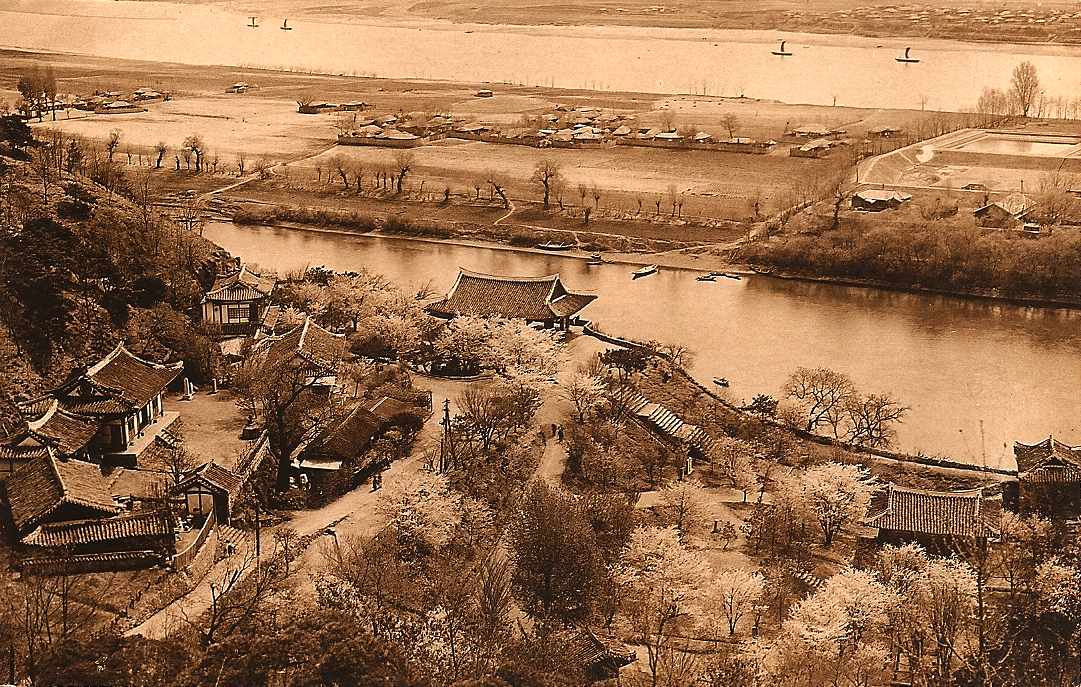
Yongmyongsa in the 1930s

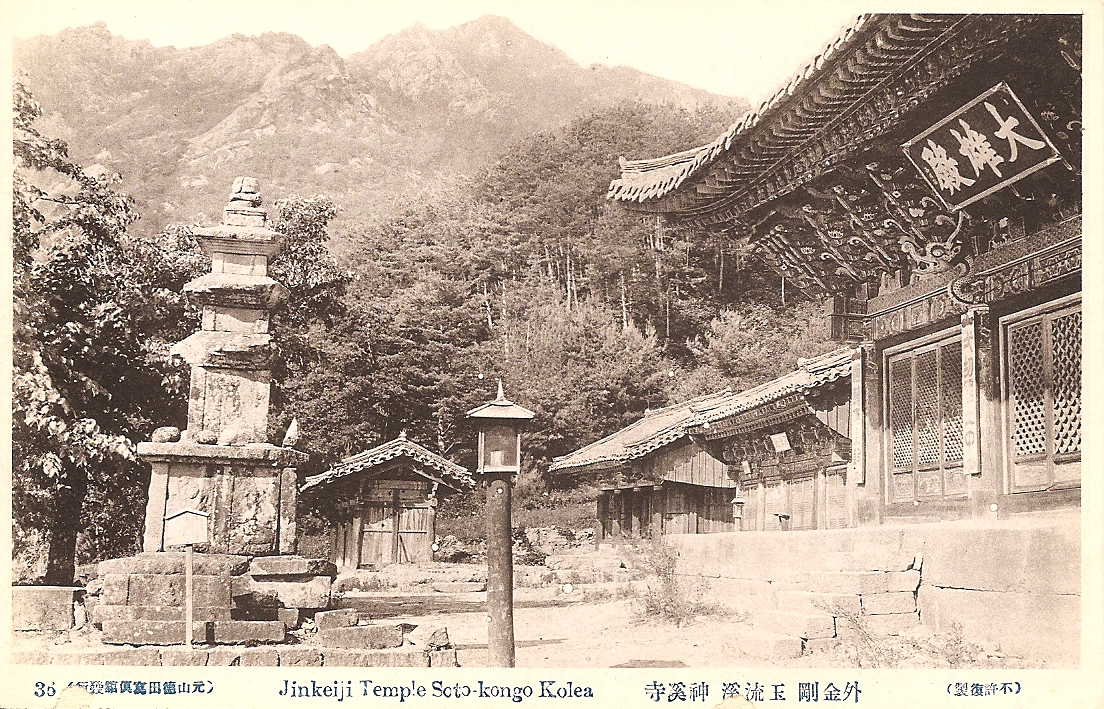
Singyesa in the 1930s

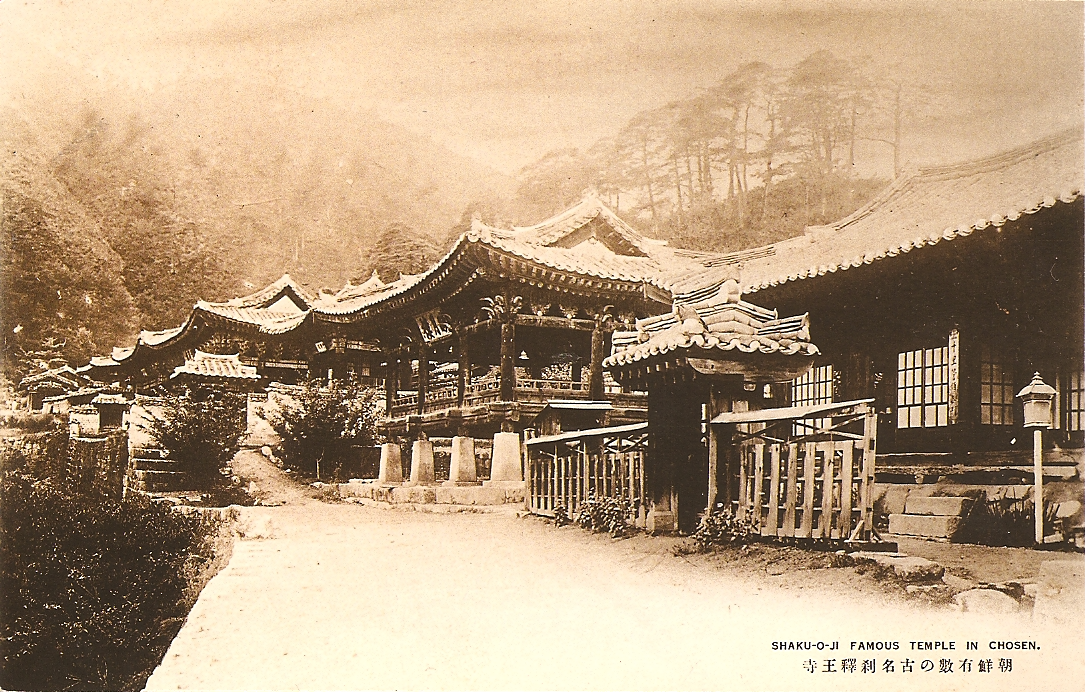
Sogwangsa in the 1930s

Pictures taken in the 1930s

== Temples in South Korea ==
There are about 900 traditional temples (전통사찰) in South Korea, out of about 20,000 Buddhist temples in total. As of 2020, Jogye Order, Taego Order, and Beophwa Order have 783, 96, and 17 traditional temples out of 968, respectively. Region-wise, North Gyeongsang, North Jeolla, and Gyeonggi have 178, 118, 104 traditional temples respectively. Jeondeungsa built in 381 is the oldest extant temple in South Korea.

Multiple temples are designated as UNESCO World Heritage Site: Janggyeong Panjeon of Haeinsa, Seokguram and Bulguksa, Hwangnyongsa and Bunhwangsa as part of Gyeongju Historic Areas, Jeongnimsa and Mireuksa as part of Baekje Historic Areas, and Tongdosa, Buseoksa, Bongjeongsa, Beopjusa, Magoksa, Seonamsa, and Daeheungsa as Sansa.

Three Jewels Temples, a term made in mid Joseon, refers to Tongdosa, Haeinsa, and Songgwangsa. They each represent Buddha, his teachings, and his followers, the Three Jewels of Buddhism.

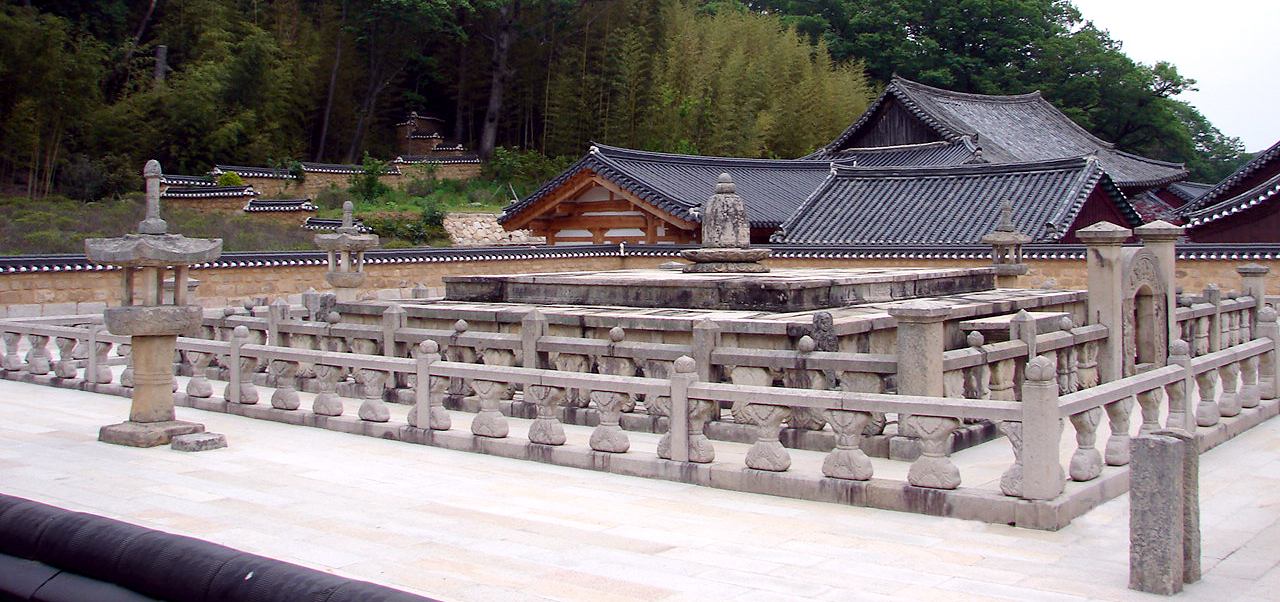
Tongdosa

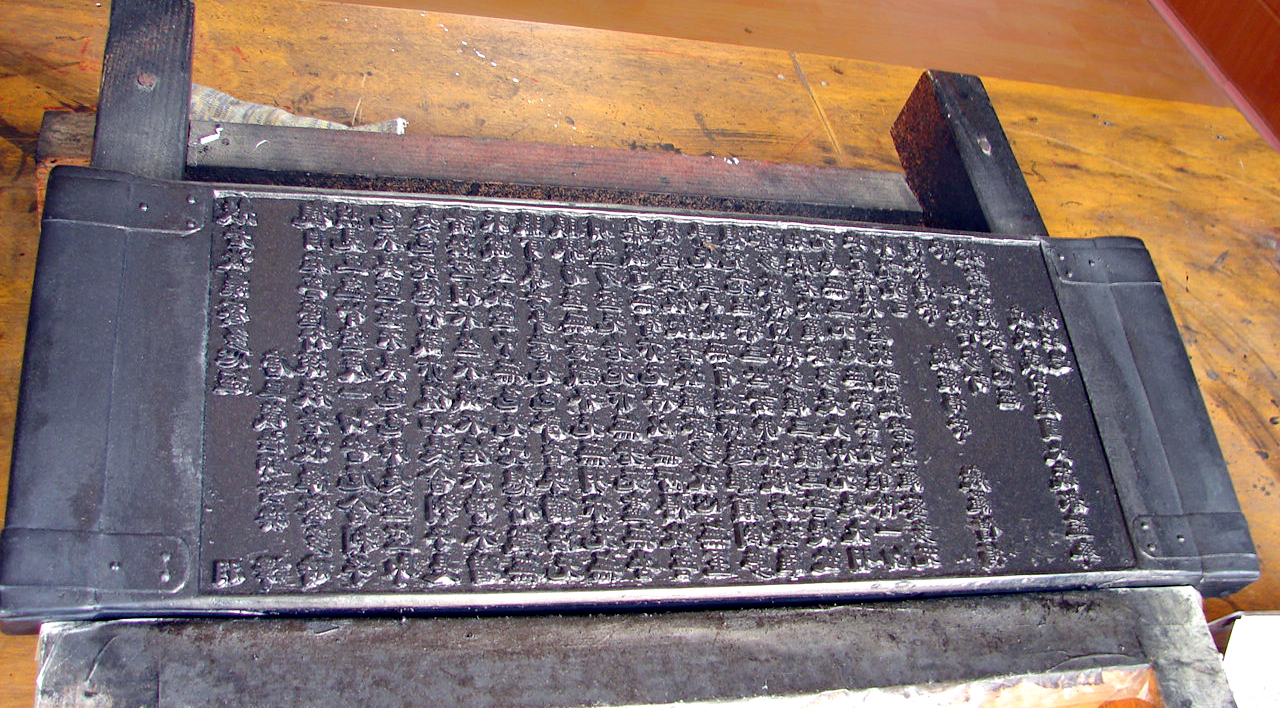
Haeinsa

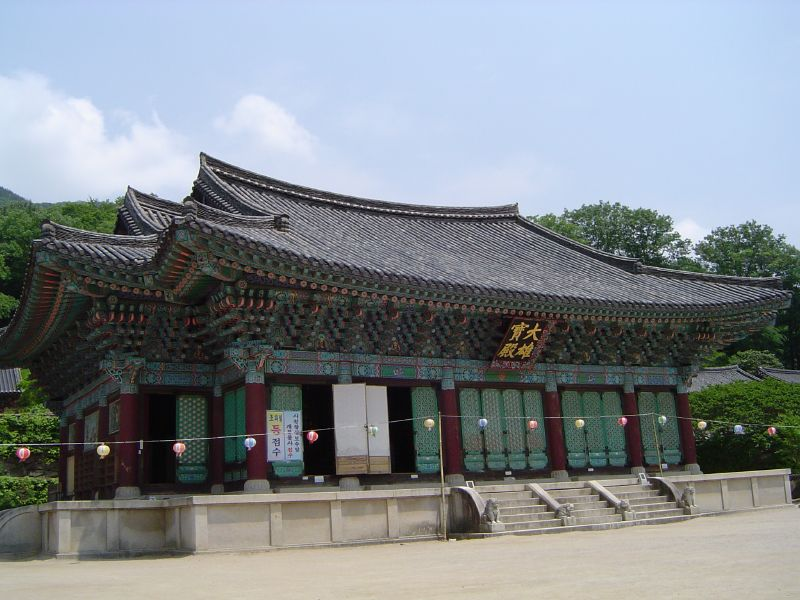
Songgwangsa

Three Jewels Temples

== See also ==
- Korean Buddhism
- List of Buddhist temples in Korea
