= Beopdang =

Type of building in Korean Buddhist temples

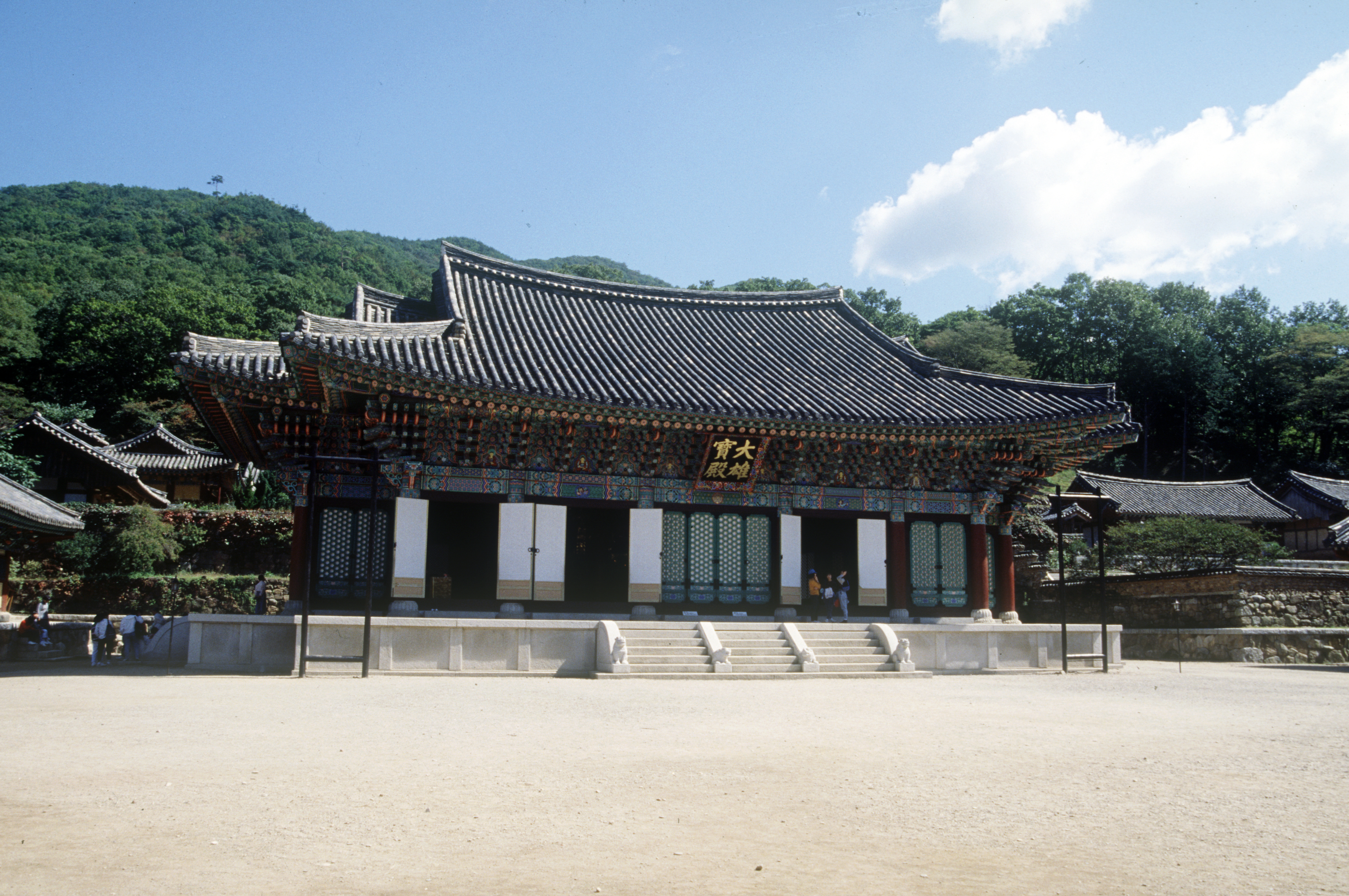
- Daeungjeon of Songgwangsa in Suncheon

Korean name
- Hangul: 법당
- Hanja: 法堂
- RR: beopdang
- MR: pŏptang

Beopdang (Korean: 법당; Hanja: 法堂), also called buljeon (불전; 佛殿; lit. 'Buddha hall') or geumdang (금당; 金堂; lit. 'Gold house'), refers to buildings that enshrine Buddha and Bodhisattva in Korean Buddhist temples.

== Etymology ==
Until the early Goryeo period, Buddha halls were called geumdang, reflecting the wuxing concept in which yellow symbolizes the center. Later, Seon Buddhism used the term beopdang, which means house of Dharma filled with eternal freedom and truth. After the Goryeo period, the names of beopdang began to vary depending on the type of deity enshrined within them.

Meanwhile, in China and Japan, beopdang (fǎtáng in Chinese and hōdō in Japanese) refers to a space where sermons are delivered.

== History ==
Originally, beopdang was a place for sermons and located behind buljeon (building where Buddha statues are enshrined). However, in smaller temples, beopdang and buljeon were not distinguished and sermons were delivered in buljeon. As Seon Buddhism flourished in Korea, buljeon was also called beopdang and most Buddhist events were held there.

One temple had one beopdang in the Three Kingdoms period but began to have multiple beopdangs from the Northern and Southern States period.

== Types ==
Worship halls in Korean Buddhist temples can be classified into three types according to deity of worship: sangdan (상단; 上壇), jungdan (중단; 中壇) and hadan (하단; 下壇). Sangdan which houses Buddha is usually placed in the middle and jungdan which houses Bodhisattvas and Arhats are placed next to or behind sangdan. Hadan which enshrines Dharmapalas and indigenous gods are small and placed in the corner of temples. Beopdang usually refers to sangdan but can be used to refer to all types.

=== Sangdan ===
- Daeungjeon (대웅전; 大雄殿) enshrines Buddha.
- Geungnakjeon (극락전; 極樂殿), also called amitajeon (아미타전; 阿彌陀殿) or muryangsujeon (무량수전; 無量壽殿), enshrines Amitābha.
- Yaksajeon (약사전; 藥師殿) enshrines Bhaisajyaguru.
- Gwaneumjeon (관음전; 觀音殿), also called wontongjeon (원통전; 圓通殿), enshrines Gwanseeum Bosal.
- Daejeokgwangjeon (대적광전; 大寂光殿), also called hwaeomjeon (화엄전; 華嚴殿) or birojeon (비로전; 毘盧殿), enshrines Vairocana.
- Mireukjeon (미륵전; 彌勒殿), also called yonghwajeon (용화전; 龍華殿), enshrines Mireuk.
- Yeongsanjeon (영산전; 靈山殿), also called palsangjeon (팔상전; 捌相殿), enshrines palsangdo (painting depicting the life of Buddha in eight scenes).
- Nahanjeon (나한전; 羅漢殿) or eungjinjeon (응진전; 應眞殿) enshrines Buddha and 16 Arhats.
- Jeongmyeolbogung (적멸보궁; 寂滅寶宮) enshrines sarira of Buddha.

=== Jungdan ===
- Jijangjeon (지장전; 地藏殿), also called myeongbujeon (명부전; 冥府殿), enshrines Jijang and Ten Kings of Hell.
- Josadang (조사당; 祖師堂) honors the founder of a Buddhist sect or temple.
- Sacheonwangmun (사천왕문; 四天王門) enshrines Four Heavenly Kings.
- Geumgangmun (금강문; 金剛門) enshrines Geumgang yeoksa.

=== Hadan ===
- Sansingak (산신각; 山神閣) enshrines Sansin.
- Chilseonggak (칠성각; 七星閣) enshrines Chilseong, the god of longevity.
- Dokseonggak (독성각; 獨聖閣) enshrines Dokseong who reached enlightenment alone without a teacher.
- Samseonggak (삼성각; 三聖閣) enshrines Sansin, Chilseong, and Dokseong.

== See also ==
- Mahavira Hall: Main hall in East Asian Buddhist temples
- Dharma Hall: Buildings in Buddhist temples where sermons are given
