= Pindola Bharadvaja =

Enlightened monastic disciple of the Buddha

Venerable Pindola
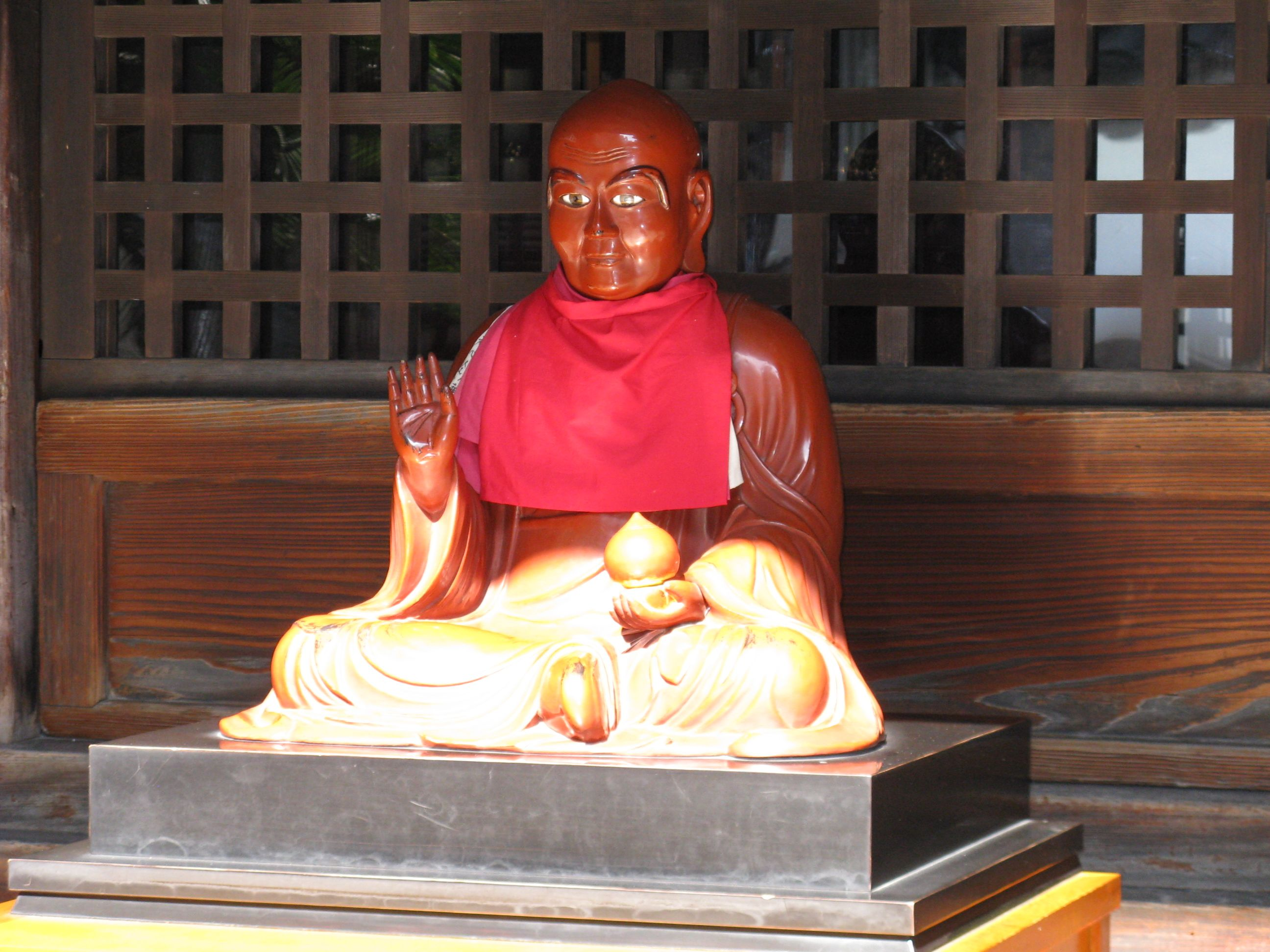
- Pindola (Japanese: 賓頭盧, Chinese: 賓頭盧/宾头卢) statue in Mitsu-tera Temple, Osaka, Japan (日本，大阪，三津寺)

Personal life
- Other name: Pindola Bharadvaja
- Occupation: bhikkhu

Religious life
- Religion: Buddhism

Senior posting
- Teacher: Buddha

Pindola Bharadvaja (Piṇḍola Bhāradvāja) is an Arhat in Buddhism. According to the earliest Indian Buddhist sutras, Pindola Bharadvaja was one of four Arhats asked by the Buddha to remain in the world (Chinese: 住世) to propagate Buddhist law (dharma). Each of the four was associated with one of the four cardinal directions. Pindola is associated with West.

Pindola is said to have excelled in the mastery of occult and psychic powers. He was once remonstrated by the Buddha for misusing his powers to impress simple, ignorant people.

Along with Ananda, Pindola preached to the women of Udena's palace at Kosambi on two occasions.

In later centuries, the number of Arhats increases from four to Sixteen Arhats, then later on to 18. In Tibetan Thangka paintings depicting the 18 Arhats, Pindola Bharadvaja is usually depicted holding a book and begging bowl.

== Regional Influence ==
=== Japan ===
In Japan, Pindola is called Binzuru (賓頭盧; びんずる), a short form of Bindora Baradaja (賓度羅跋囉惰闍; びんどら ばらだじゃ), and is arguably the most popular of all the Arhats. The monastery refectory near Tōdai-ji temple at Nara has a large wooden statue of Binzuru, depicting him seated in the lotus position. Statues of him are usually well worn, since the devotees follow the custom of rubbing a part of the effigy corresponding to the sick parts of their bodies, as he is reputed to have the gift of healing. Nagano, whose Zenkoji temple also hosts a well-worn Binzuru statue, stages a yearly Binzuru festival.

He is very frequently offered red and white bibs and children's caps to watch over the health of babies, thus his statue is often decked in rags. He is represented in paintings as an old man seated on a rock, holding a sort of sceptre (a Japanese shaku), or a sutra box and a feather fan. All the other Arahants are usually worshipped in Japan in his person.

=== Chinese Buddhism ===
In Chinese community, Pindola is usually called Bīntóulú (simplified Chinese: 宾头卢; traditional Chinese: 賓頭盧), who is regarded as the "First in Blessings" (福田第一) disciple of Sakyamuni Buddha. His image is sometimes placed in a prominent position during any gatherings of monastics who share a vegetarian feast.

=== Tibetan Buddhism ===
Pindola Bharadvaja (Skt. Piṇḍolabhāradvāja; Tib. པིཎྜོ་ལ་བྷཱ་ར་དྭཱ་ཛཿ བྷ་ར་དྷྭ་ཛ་བསོད་སྙོམས་ལེན་, Bharadodza Sönyom Le; Wyl. bha ra dhwa dza bsod snyoms len) — one of the Sixteen Arhats.

Born into a family of royal chaplains, he found no meaning in this life. Seeing the gifts and favours that were bestowed on the Buddha's disciples he had decided to become a monk. At first he was very greedy, and went about with a large alms bowl, however, following the Buddha's personal advice he conquered his greed and lived strictly on whatever he received and soon became an arhat. He constantly showed his gratitude to the Buddha by obeying his words and working only for the benefit of others.

Pindola Bharadvaja lives in a mountain cave on the eastern continent (Purvavideha) with 1,000 arhats. He carries a scripture in his right hand and an alms bowl in his left which he uses to aid those in the lower realms, conferring wisdom and granting wishes, protecting from misfortune

=== Korea ===
Dokseong (Korean: 독성; Hanja: 獨聖) or Nabanjonja (나반존자; 那畔尊者) in Korean Buddhism is thought to be Pindola Bharadvaja although some view it as Tan'gun. The deity is depicted having white hair, long eyebrows, and a smile. It is often enshrined in dokseonggak or samseonggak with Sansin and Chilseongsin (Big Dipper) in Korean Buddhist temples.

=== India ===
Piṇḍola, belonging to the Brahmin Bhāradvāja gotra, is said to have been from Pūrva Videha. In the Bhāradvājasutta of the Samyutta Nikāya (in the Theravādin suttapitaka), he is described as residing at the famous Ghositārāma, and preaching to King Udena (Udayana) of Kauśambī.

== Gallery ==
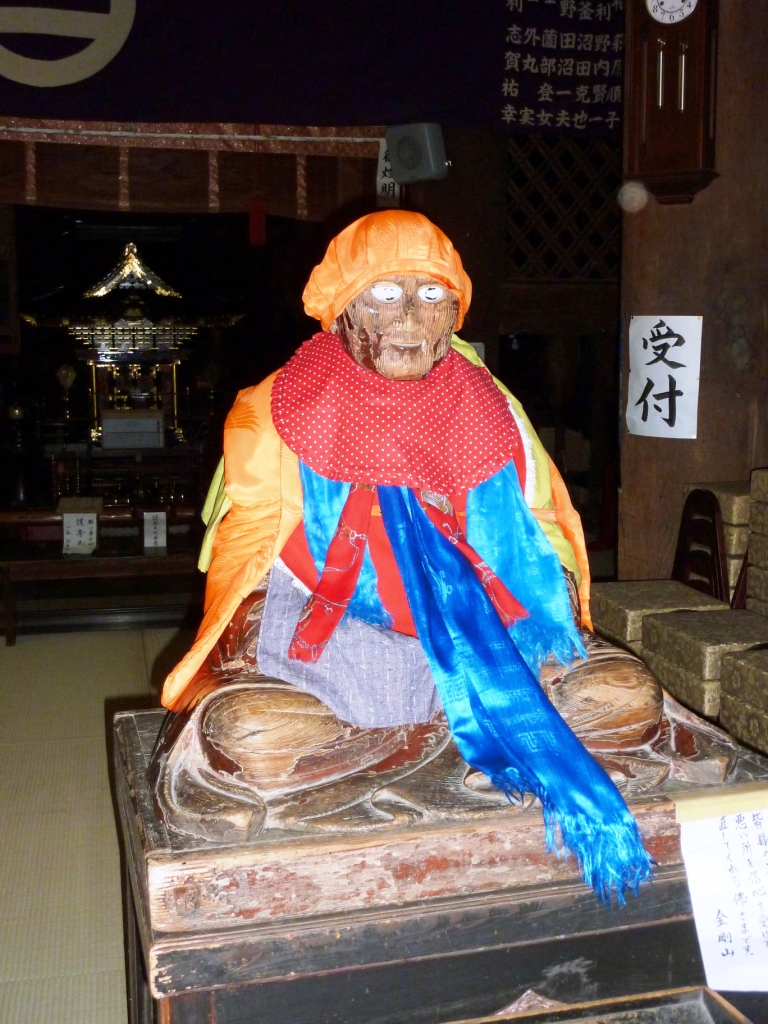
Statue attributed to 1299 AD of Binzuru at Banna-ji Temple, Japan

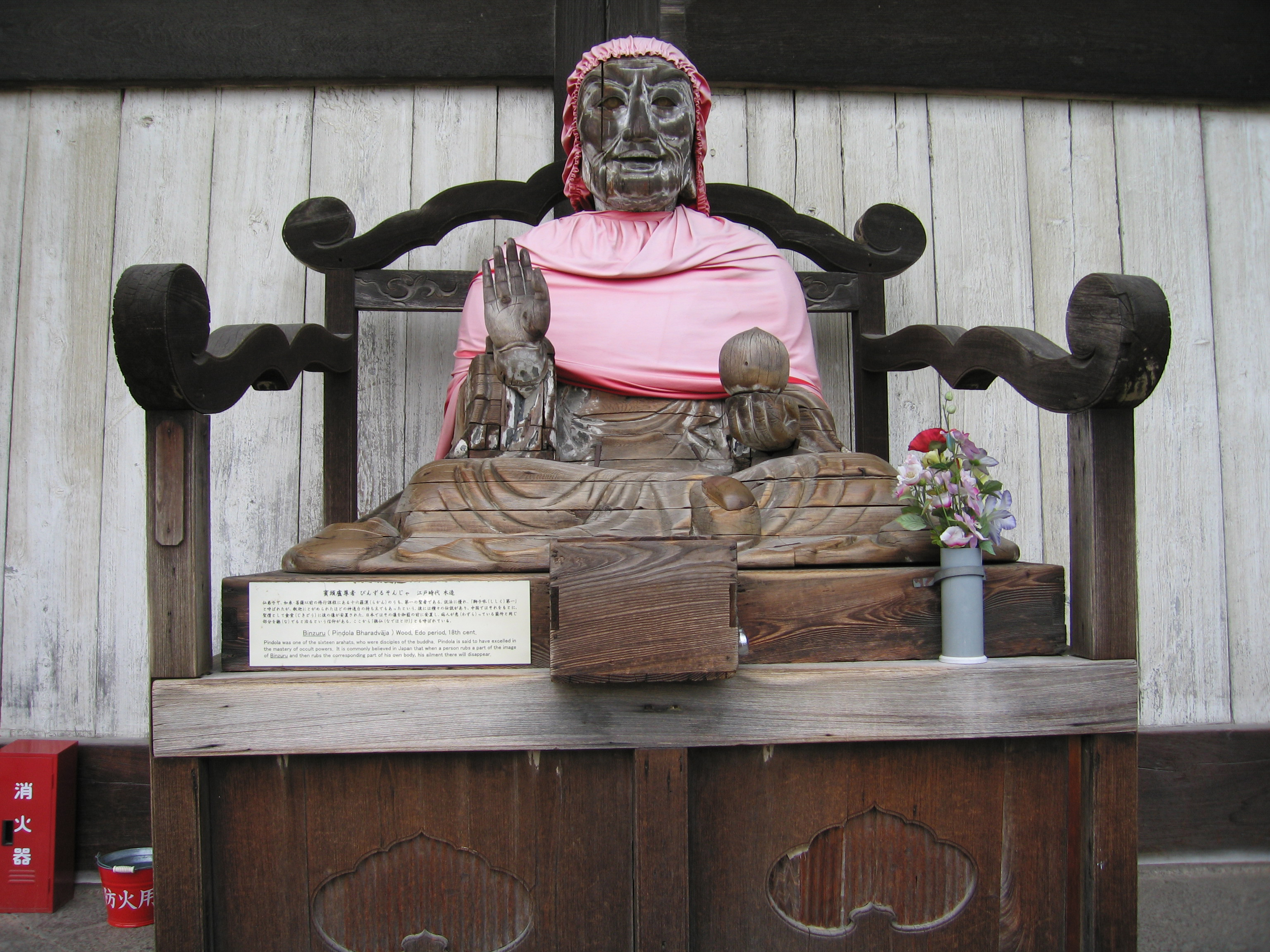
Wooden Binzuru (healer) sculpture at Todai-ji temple in Nara, Japan

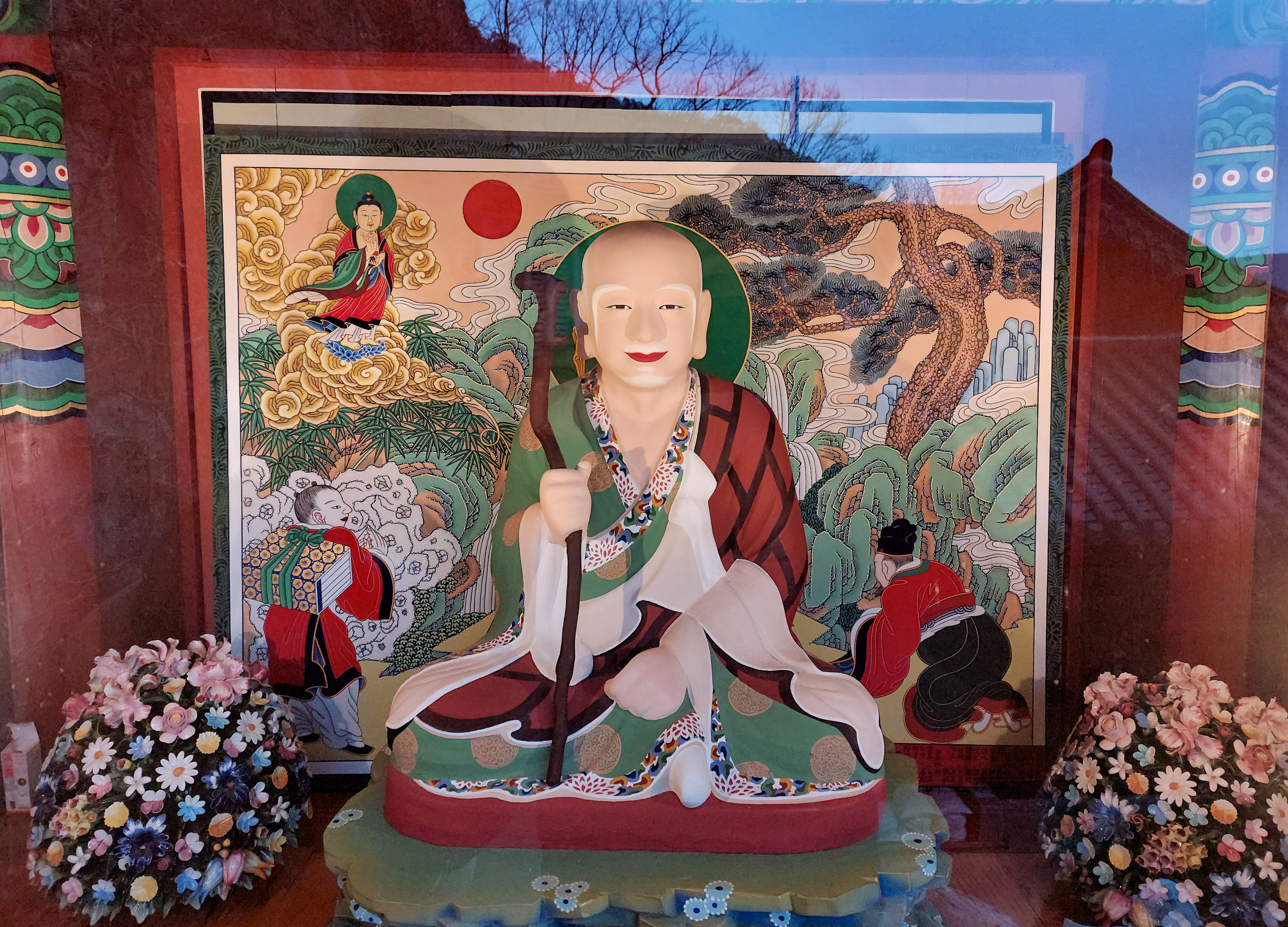
Nabanjonja in Sariam in South Korea
