= Sangha residence =

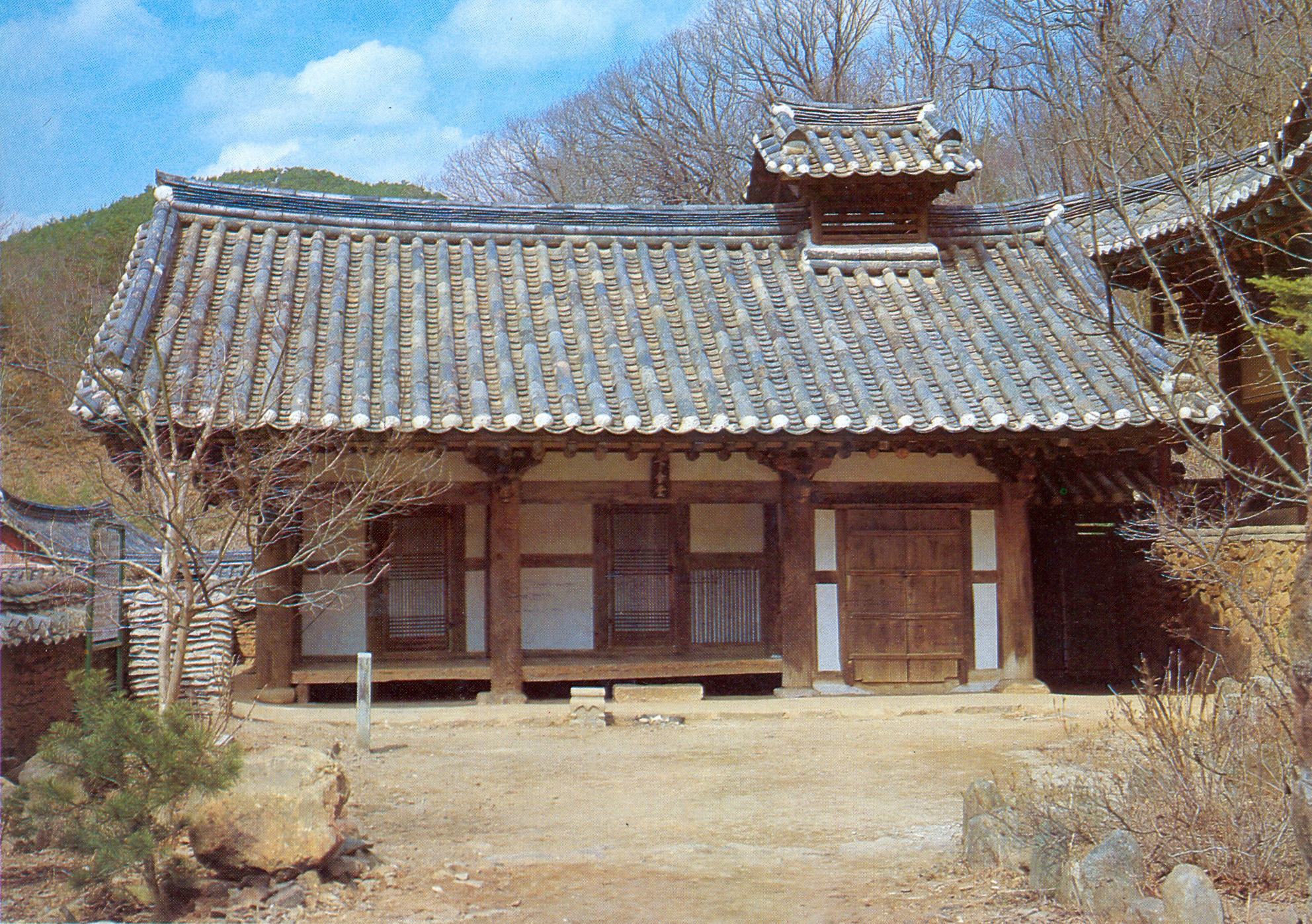
- Hasadang of Songgwangsa

Chinese name
- Traditional Chinese: 僧舍
Transcriptions
Standard Mandarin
- Hanyu Pinyin: sēngshè

Korean name
- Hangul: 승당
- Hanja: 僧堂
Transcriptions
- Revised Romanization: seungdang

Japanese name
- Kanji: 僧房

Sangha residence is where Buddhist monks live in Buddhist temples. It is called sēngshè (僧舍) in Chinese, seungdang (Korean: 승당; Hanja: 僧堂) in Korean, and sōbō (僧房) in Japanese.

== Korea ==
Yosachae (요사채; 寮舍채) refers to the living space and resting place of monks and seungbang (승방; 僧房) refers to where they study and practice Buddhism, but the two terms are not differentiated nowadays. A notable example of seungdang is Hasadang of Songgwangsa which is designated as treasure.

=== Types ===
Yosachae consists of daejung yosa (대중요사) where ordinary monks live and nojeon (노전) where monks responsible for managing the beopdang and other temple duties reside. Daejung yosa includes facilities such as kitchens and storage rooms as well as guest quarters and dining areas. These facilities are also called huwon (후원) as they are usually located behind other buildings. Stone walls are built around huwon to restrict outsiders’ access and to protect the privacy of monks.

== Significance ==
In the history of Buddhist architecture, spaces for monks’ practice and daily life were established first and pagodas and Buddhist halls were constructed later, so sangha residence is an important part of Buddhist architecture.

== See also ==
- Vihāra: Buddhist temple in the Indian subcontinent
