= Mountain God =

East Asian tutelary deities

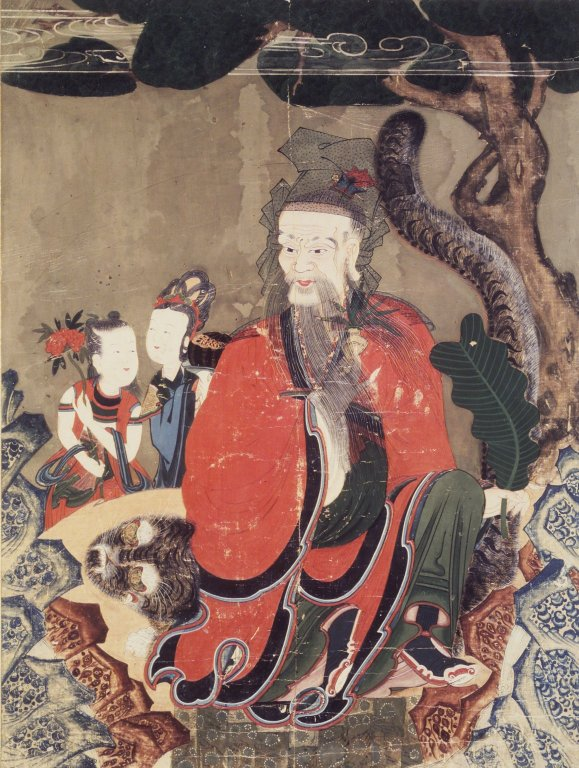
- Korean representation of a sansin

Chinese name
- Chinese: 山神
Transcriptions
Standard Mandarin
- Hanyu Pinyin: shānshén

Vietnamese name
- Vietnamese alphabet: sơn thần thần núi
- Chữ Hán: 山神
- Chữ Nôm: 神𡶀

Korean name
- Hangul: 산신
- Hanja: 山神
Transcriptions
- Revised Romanization: Sansin
- McCune–Reischauer: Sansin

Japanese name
- Kanji: 山の神
- Kana: やまのかみ
Transcriptions
- Romanization: Yama no Kami

Mountain Gods (Chinese: 山神) are Asian tutelary deities associated with mountains. They are related to dizhu shen, tudigongs and City Gods.

They are well known in Korea and some prominent Chinese mountains have shrines to similar deities in the Daoist traditions, called Shanshen. The Japanese equivalent is the Yama-no-Kami (山の神; also pronounced as yamagami) and the Vietnamese equivalent is Sơn thần (山神).

Houtu is the overlord of all the Tudigongs ("Lord of Local Land"), Sheji ("the State"), Shan Shen ("God of Mountains"), City Gods ("God of Local City"), and dizhu shen worldwide.

== China ==
In China, legends about Shanshen (山神) have a long history. The Classic of Mountains and Seas (山海经), which was written more than 2,000 years ago, has already recorded various legends about Shanshen; specifically the Wuzang Shanjing (五藏山经) part contains a detailed description of the appearance of the mountain gods. The Taiping Guangji (太平广记) also contains the story of Dayu, who imprisoned the Shangzhang clan and the Dulu clan, among other Shanshen.

Ancient Chinese people worshipped mountains by deifying them. From the Shanshen's title to see the mountain god worship is extremely complex, all kinds of ghosts and spirits are attached to the mountain. Eventually, the names and differences of the various ghosts and spirits disappeared, or they merged with each other. It evolved into a situation where the main peaks of each region were inhabited by personalised Shanshens. According to the Law of Sacrifices in the Confucian classic Book of Rites, "the mountains, forests, valleys and hills, which can produce clouds, provide wind and rain, and see monsters, are all called gods." When Emperor Yu and Shun had the sacrificial system of "looking at the mountains and rivers, all over the gods", legend has it that Shun had a tour of Mount Tai, Mount Heng, Mount Hua and Mount Heng. Successive generations of the Son of Heaven Zen carry out sacrifices to heaven and earth, and also to the gods of the mountains. Most of the mountain sacrifices were made with jade and jade buried in the ground, and there were also the sacrificial methods of "casting" and "hanging", whereby offerings of chickens, goats, pigs or jade were thrown into the valleys or hung in the treetops.

The deities of the Five Sacred Mountains of China are collectively known as Wuyue Dadi [zh] (五嶽大帝, lit. Great Kings of the Five Sacred Mountains):

- Chidi of Mount Heng (South Mountain)
- Dongyue Emperor of Mount Tai (East Mountain)
- Heidi of Mount Heng (North Mountain)
- Huangdi of Mount Song (Center Mountain)
- Xiyue Dadi of Mount Hua (West Mountain)

=== Other mountain deities ===
- Lishan Laomu, the goddess of Mount Li
- Yaoji, the goddess of Wu Mountains

== Korea ==
Sansin (Korean: 산신; Hanja: 山神) are mountain deities in Korean shamanism. They are thought to grant health, wealth, and eradication of illness. The grandeur, mystery, and shape of mountains are thought to have inspired mountain worship.

As it became one of the Dharmapala when it was accepted in Korean Buddhism, most Korean Buddhist temples have a building called sansingak (산신각; 山神閣) dedicated to the deity. The deity is also often enshrined in samseonggak with Chilseong and Dokseong.

=== Worship ===
Sansinje or sanchiseong is a jesa to the local Sansin that protects the village. It is held at a sansindan altar located on the mountain behind the village between January 3 on the lunisolar calendar and Daeboreum. Expenses are shared by the villagers and people in charge of the ritual (jegwan, chukgwan, and hwaju) observe a period of purification. During the ceremony, the jegwan offers liquor, the chukgwan recites the invocation, and the hwaju prepares the food. The next day, the villagers share the food and have a celebration with music.

=== Depiction ===
Depictions of Sansin have Shamanist, Taoist, Buddhist, and Confucian influences. Sansin was originally depicted as a woman but was gradually depicted as an old man due to Confucianism. In Buddhist paintings, it is depicted as a white-bearded old man with a tiger against the background of a pine tree forest. Sansin is often shown holding various objects such as a long wooden staff or a fan made of crane feathers.

=== Notable sansin ===
- Unjesan Seongmo (운제산성모; 雲梯山聖母) is a goddess believed to have lived in Unjesan during the Silla dynasty. She is responsible for water and abundant harvest as evidenced by records stating that prayers to her during drought were efficacious.
- Jirisan Seongmo (지리산성모; 智異山聖母) was worshipped as the mother of Taejo of Goryeo. There is a story that prayers to the goddess brought an end to the rain.

=== Gallery ===
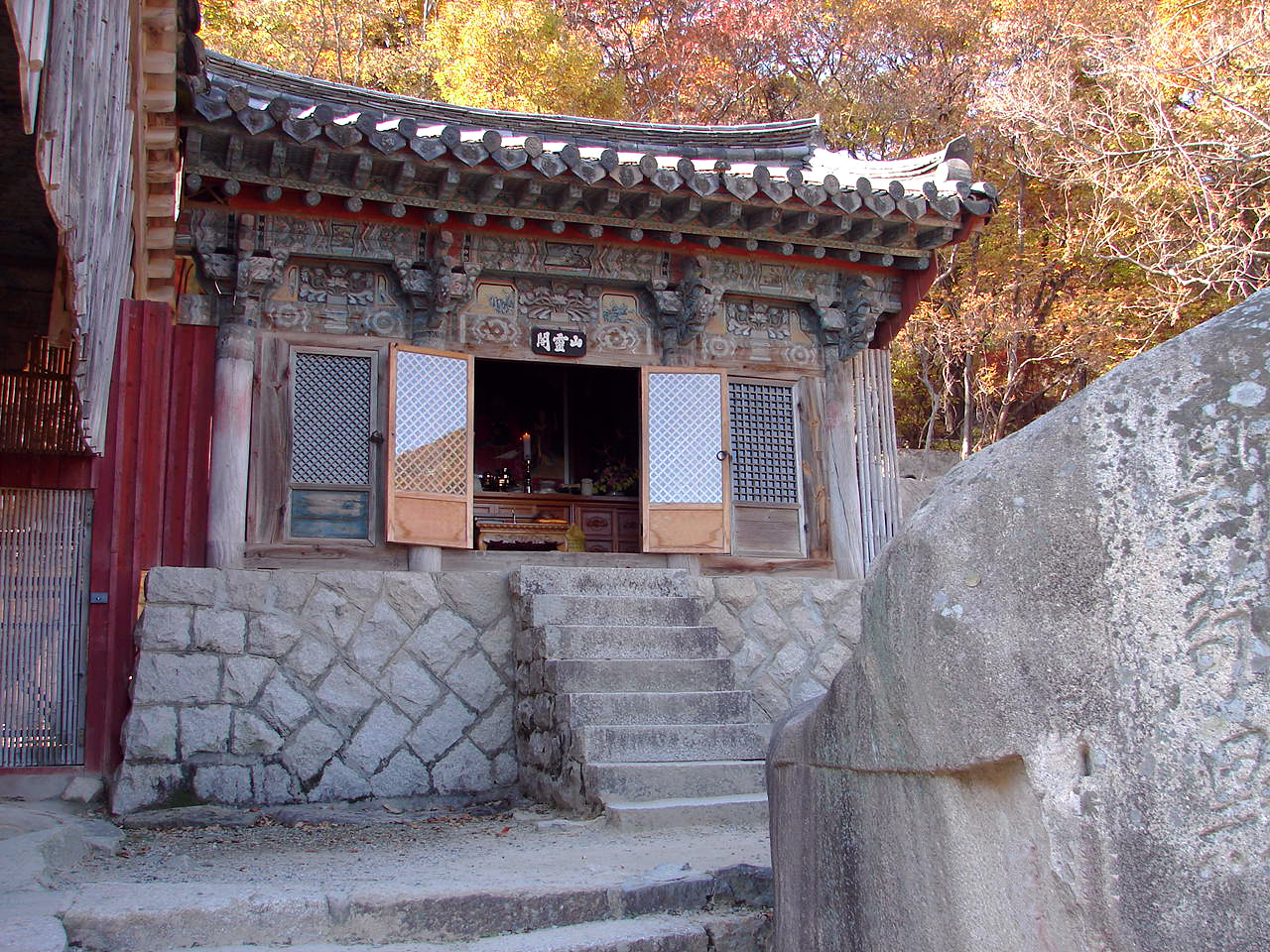
Salleonggak of Beomeosa

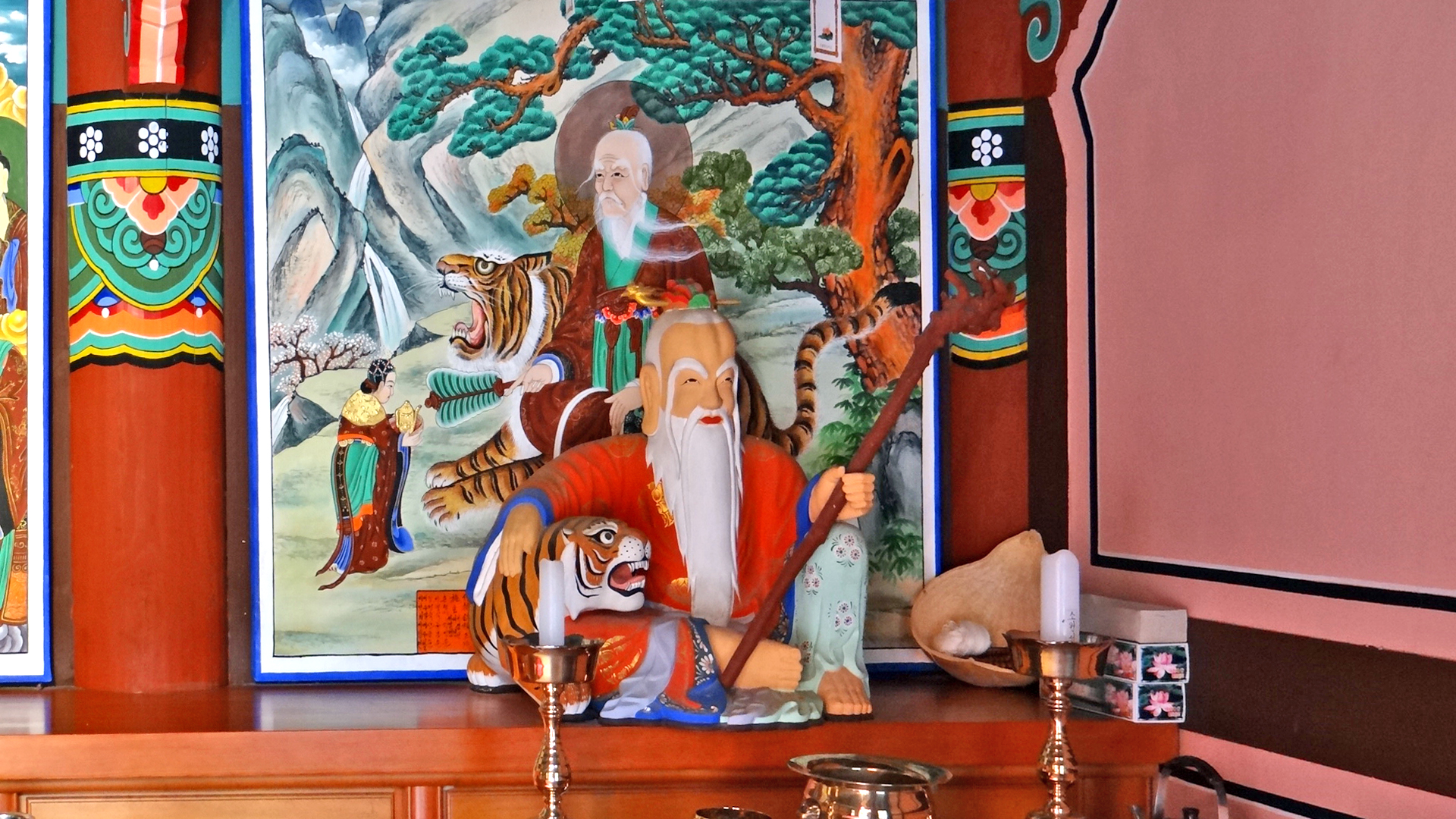
Depiction of Sansin in chilseonggak of Dorimsa

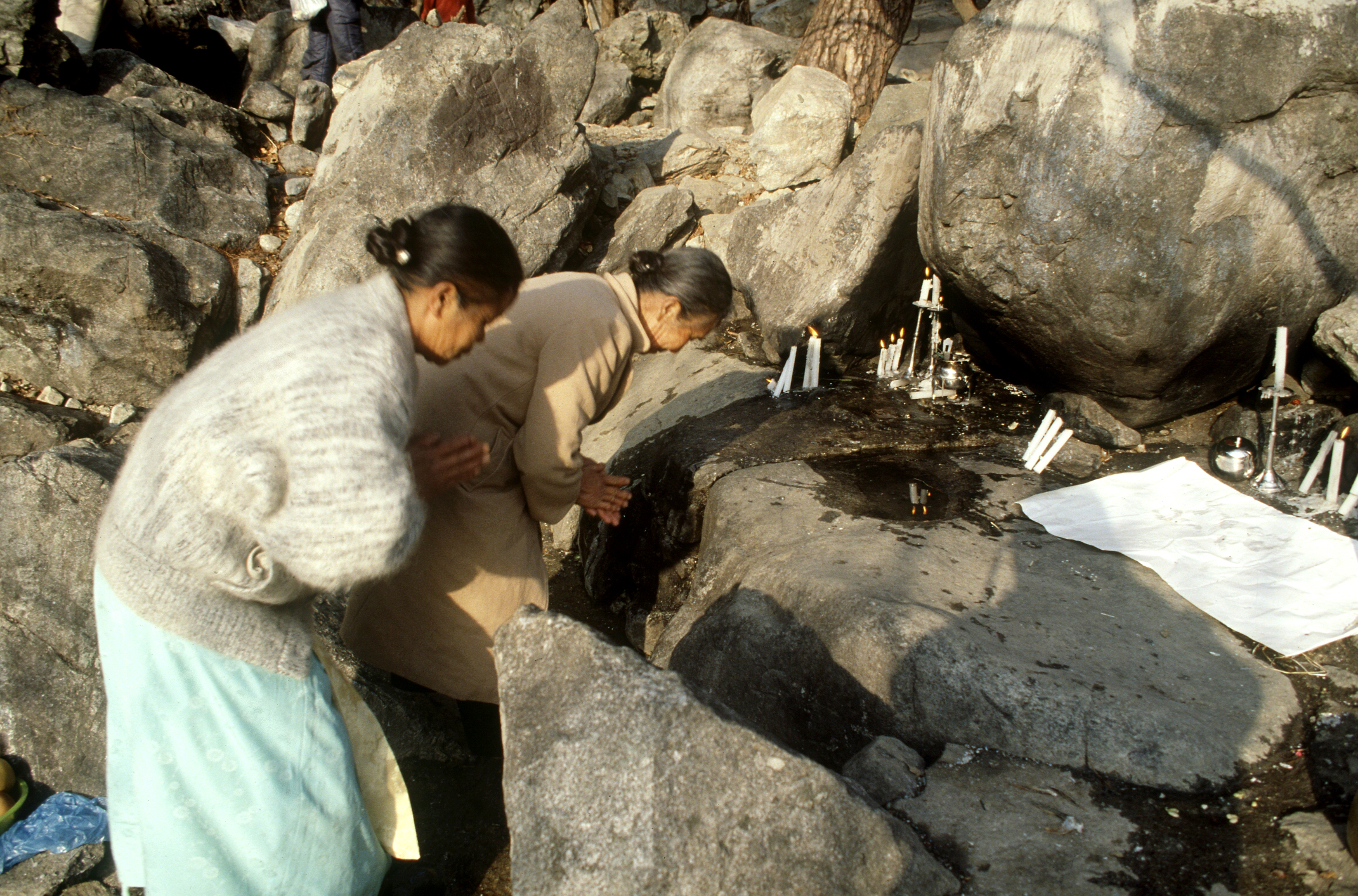
Sanchiseong

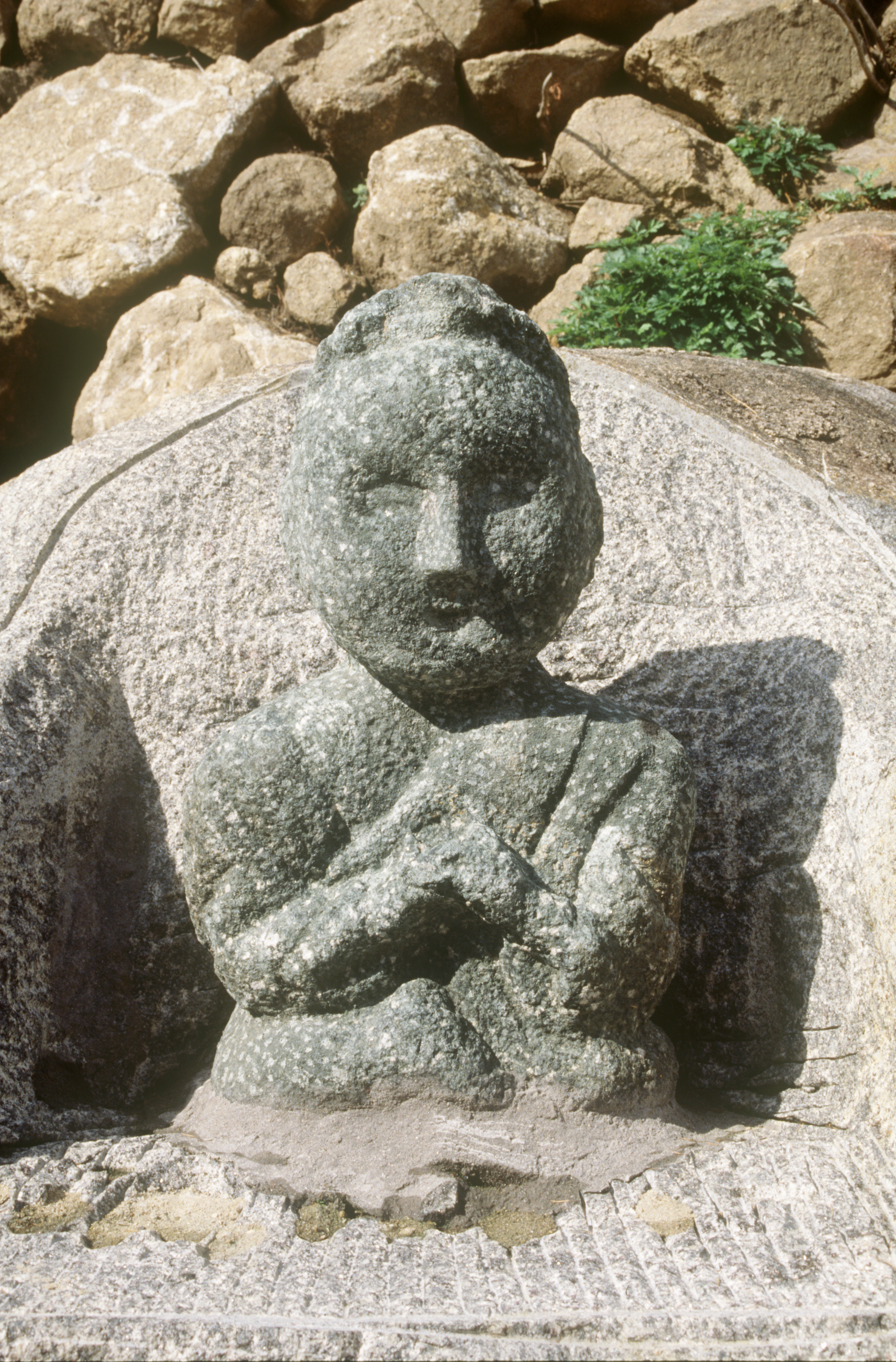
Statue of Jirisan Seongmo

== Vietnam ==
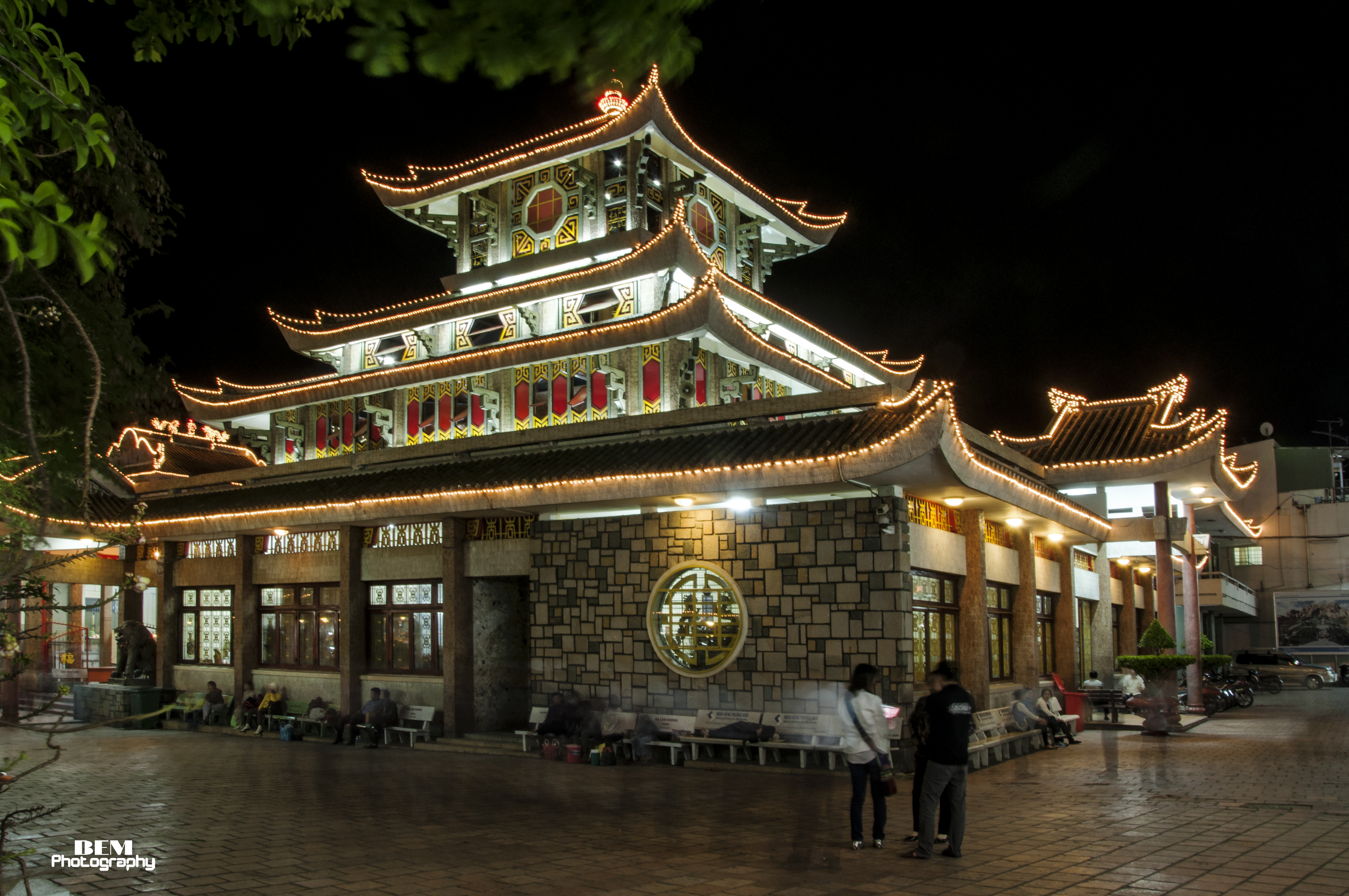
Bà Chúa Xứ Temple in Sam Mountain, Châu Đốc, An Giang

Some of the most popularly worshiped mountain deities in Vietnam

- Bà Chúa Xứ, the goddess of Sam Mountain
- Bà Đen, the goddess of Black Virgin Mountain
- Bà Rá, the goddess of Bà Rá Mountain
- Mẫu Thượng Ngàn
- Tản Viên Sơn Thánh, Thần Cao Sơn and Thần Quý Minh, the gods of Ba Vì mountain range

== See also ==
- Xian (Taoism)
- Hou Tu
- Lords of the Three Mountains
- Shigandang
- Tudigong
- Mountain worship
