= Kamŭnsa =

Former temple in Gyeongju, South Korea

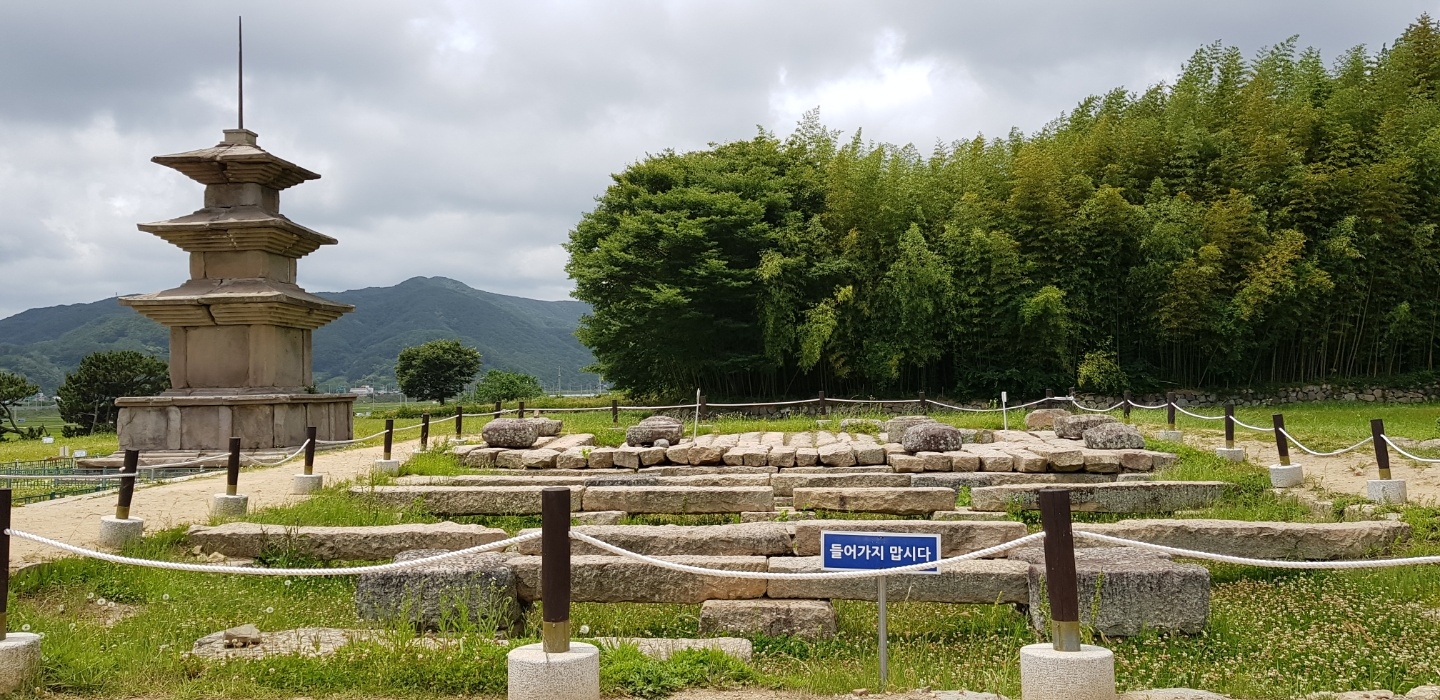
- One of the temple's pagodas and its ruins (2018)

Religion
- Affiliation: Korean Buddhism

Location
- Interactive map of Kamŭnsa
- Coordinates: 35°44′54″N 129°28′37″E
- Historic Sites of South Korea
- Official name: Gameunsa Temple Site, Gyeongju
- Designated: 1963-01-21
- Reference no.: 31

Kamŭnsa (Korean: 감은사; Hanja: 感恩寺; RR: Gameunsa) was a Silla-era Buddhist temple in what is now Gyeongju, South Korea. A site believed to be its former location was designated Historic Site of South Korea No. 31 on January 21, 1963. Two pagodas at that site were made National Treasures of South Korea No. 112 on December 20, 1962.

Its construction was initiated under King Munmu (r. 661–681). It was completed in 682, during the reign of Munmu's son King Sinmun. It is unknown when the temple fell into disuse and disrepair.
