= Samseonggak =

Type of building in Korean Buddhist temples

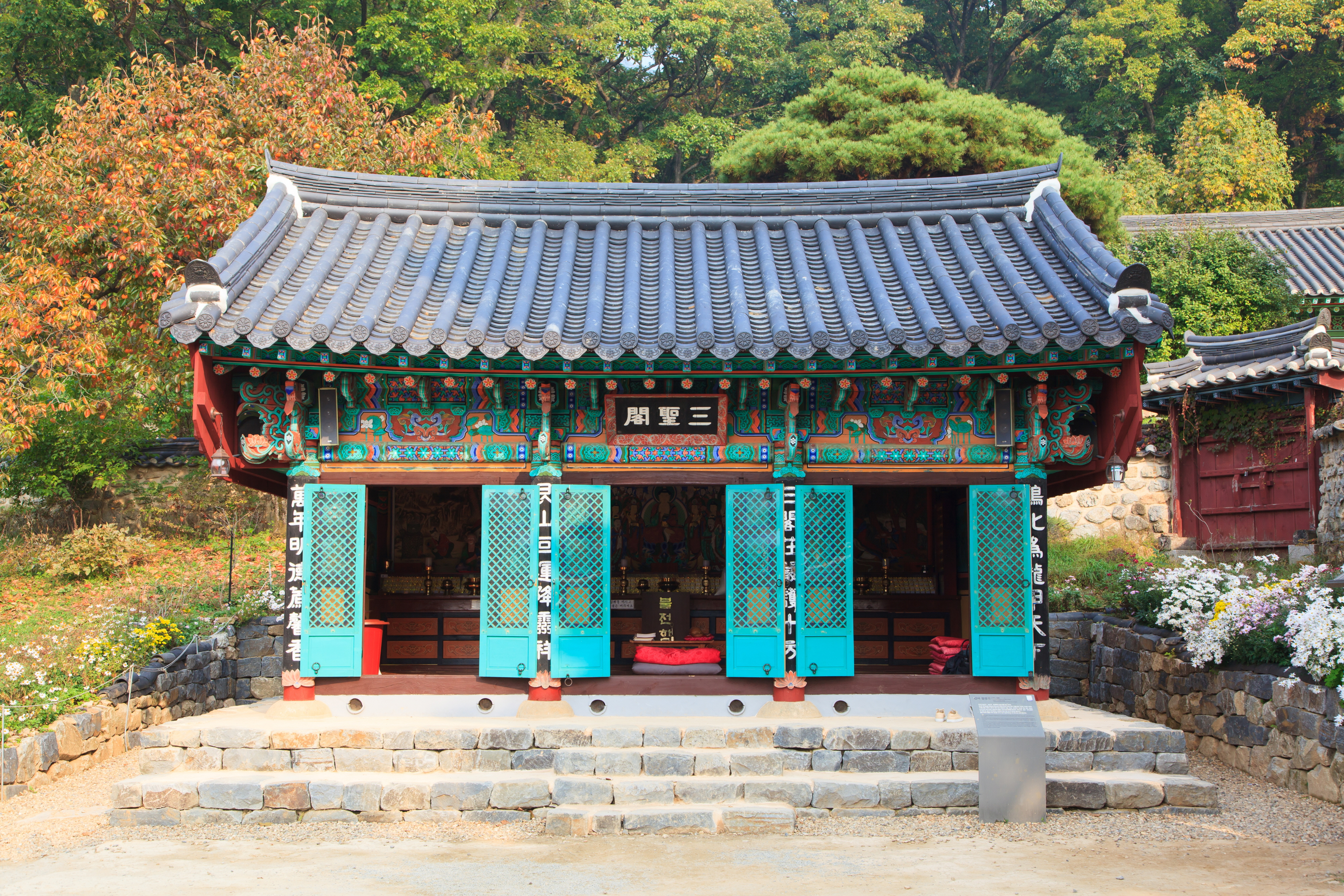
- Samseonggak of Gapsa

Korean name
- Hangul: 삼성각
- Hanja: 三聖閣
- RR: samseonggak
- MR: samsŏnggak

Samseonggak (Korean: 삼성각; Hanja: 三聖閣; lit. 'three saint house') is a type of building typically found in Korean Buddhist temples. Such buildings enshrine three deities: Sansin, an indigenous mountain deity; Chilseong, a Taoist deity; and Dokseong, a Buddhist deity. The gods are thought to grant wealth; children and longevity; and good luck and joy respectively. The worship of these deities is known as the "three god belief" (삼신신앙). Samseonggak of some temples also enshrine the three holy monks of Goryeo (Jigong, Naong, and Muhak) or Dragon King.

== Three god belief ==
Sansin (산신; 山神; lit. 'mountain god') is a god indigenous to Korea. The belief of Sansin was common in Korea as every village had a mountain and every mountain was believed to contain Sansin. When indigenous beliefs were incorporated into Buddhism, Sansin became one of the Dharmapala.

Chilseong (칠성; 七星; lit. 'seven stars; Big Dipper'), a god in charge of longevity, is thought to have originated in China and is related to Taoism.

Dokseong (독성; 獨聖; lit. 'alone saint'), also called Nabanjonja (나반존자; 那畔尊者), is a Buddhist saint who seeks enlightenment alone and gives sentient beings good luck. The identity of Dokseong is disputed: some see it as Pindola Bharadvaja while others view it as Dangun Wanggeom.

Three god belief is an example of Korean religious hybridism that merges Korean indigenous belief, Taoism, and Buddhism. However, it was sometimes criticized in modern Korean Buddhism: Han Yong-un argued that Dokseong should not be an object of worship as it is a saint of Hinayana and belief of Sansin and Chilseong should also be abolished.

== Characteristics ==
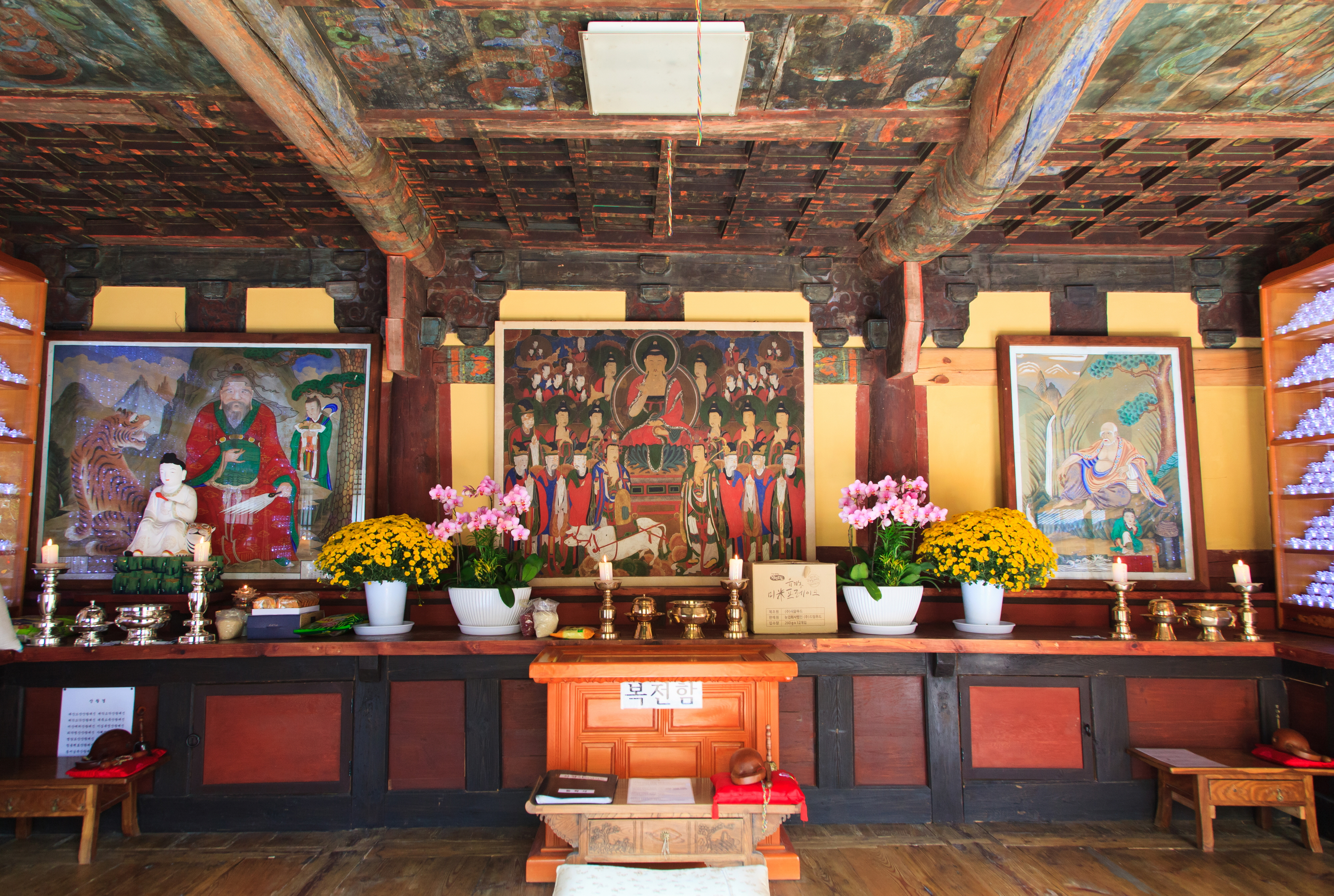
Inside samseonggak of Donghaksa

Samseonggak buildings are found in most Korean Buddhist temples and are usually located on the outer edges of the temple grounds. They are typically three kan wide at the front and one kan deep at the side. Inside the building, representation of Chilseong is usually placed at the center with that of Sansin and Dokseong next to it.

Paintings of Chilseong from the Goryeo dynasty often depict the deity with other star gods such as Jeseokcheon (Sakra) and Noinseong (Canopus) while those from the Joseon dynasty place greater emphasis on Chilseong. Sansin is commonly portrayed as an elderly man with a white beard accompanied by a tiger in a pine forest. Dokseong is depicted as a hermit living alone in a similar natural setting.

== History ==
Most surviving samseonggak buildings and paintings of the three deities date from after the 19th century. Interest in the deities associated with worldly blessings grew significantly after the hardships caused by the Imjin War in 1592 and the Qing invasion of Joseon in 1636. Famous painters participated in creating the paintings and patrons from all levels of society commissioned them.
