= Dharma Hall =

Building in Buddhist temples

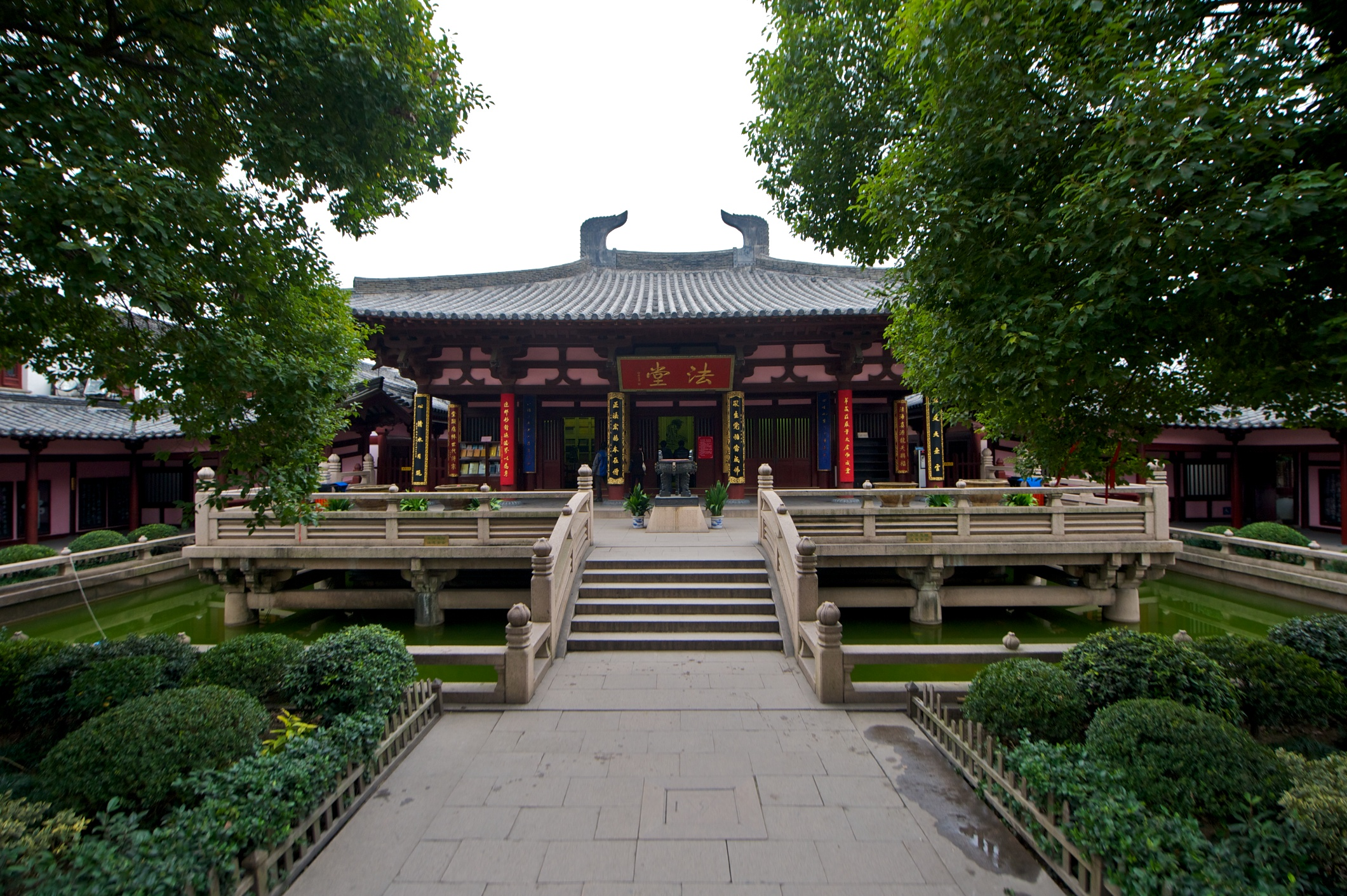
- The Dharma Hall at Hanshan Temple, in Suzhou, Jiangsu, China.

Chinese name
- Chinese: 法堂
Transcriptions
Standard Mandarin
- Hanyu Pinyin: Fǎtáng

Vietnamese name
- Vietnamese alphabet: Pháp Đường
- Chữ Hán: 法堂

Korean name
- Hangul: 강당
- Hanja: 講堂
Transcriptions
- Revised Romanization: Gangdang
- McCune–Reischauer: Kangdang

Japanese name
- Kanji: 法堂
Transcriptions
- Romanization: Hōdō

The Dharma Hall or Dhamma Hall (Pali: Dhammasālā) is a central building in Buddhist temples where teachings are delivered, scriptures are expounded, and assemblies are held.

== Theravada Buddhism ==
In Theravada Buddhism, a Dhamma Hall serves several primary functions, primarily as a pavilion where the Buddha's teachings are imparted to both monks and laypeople. This space often encompasses the role of a meditation hall, allowing the community to sit and practice. Beyond its instructional use, the hall functions as a gathering space to discuss the virtues and the merits gained through such practices. Collectively, these purposes underscore the vital role of communal learning and discussion in the practice of Dhamma.

== Mahayana Buddhism ==
Dharma Hall is called Fatang (法堂; Fǎtáng) in China, Hōdō in Japan, Gangdang in Korea, and Pháp Đường in Vietnam.

=== China ===
The Dharma Hall is a key structure in traditional Chinese Buddhism temple layouts. During the Song dynasty, it was included in the "Seven-Hall" temple plan. Architecturally, it resembles other temple halls but is designed for spaciousness and brightness, with a high platform for the lecturer, a seating arrangement, and instruments like bells and drums. The hall primarily hosts lectures and rituals rather than enshrining specific deities. It may contain a Buddha image on the lecture table and a painting or screen of a lion behind the platform, symbolizing the power of Dharma propagation. The Dharma Hall is the place for senior monks to preach and generally ranks right after the Mahavira Hall. With the similar architecture form with other halls, the Dharma Hall is more spacious. In the central back, there is a high platform with a sitting chair putting in the middle. In front of the chair is a table with a small sitting Buddha on it, behind the platform is a screen or a picture of lion which is also known as "Roaring lion" (獅子吼), hung on the wall. Seats are placed on both sides of the platform with bells and drums for senior monks to beat when they are preaching. There are also seats on both sides of the monks' seats for laymen to listen to the Buddha Dharma by senior monks. White Horse Temple in Luoyang, one of China's earliest Buddhist temple, included a Dharma Hall as part of its classical layout.

=== Japan ===
In Japan, the Dharma Hall evolved under Zen Buddhism, emphasizing simplicity and functionality. An example is the Tōdai-ji in Nara, originally built in the 8th century (740–747 CE) and expanded in 1199. It combines a rear sanctum and a front worship hall, showcasing Japanese Buddhist architecture with hip-roofs, wooden pillars, and minimalist aesthetics. The Dharma Hall at Tōdai-ji enshrines the Fukūkensaku Kannon (不空羂索観音, Amoghapāśa) as the central image, flanked by guardians like Niō, Shitennō, and Shukongōshin. These statues reflect Nara-period sculptural art.

=== Korea ===
In Korea, gangdang (강당; 講堂) is where lectures on Buddhist scriptures are held. Beopdang (법당; 法堂) or geumdang (금당; 金堂) refers to buildings that enshrine Buddha and Bodhisattva.

Gangdang was typically located behind geumdang in ancient times and in front of geumdang in the Joseon dynasty. However, as gangwon (강원; 講院), an educational institution specializing in Buddhist research, was established in the modern era, the building in front of geumdang were not used as gangdang. One notable example of gangdang is Museoljeon of Bulguksa.

Originally, beopdang referred to buildings where teachings were delivered in Seon Buddhism. However, in small temples, beopdang and buljeon (buildings that house Buddhist statues) were not differentiated. There are various types of beopdang according to deity of worship: daeungjeon houses Buddha, geungnakjeon (극락전) houses Amitābha, and jeokgwangjeon (적광전) houses Vairocana.

=== Vietnam ===
In Vietnamese Buddhism, Dharma Hall blends Sino-Vietnamese architecture, featuring curved roofs, wooden trusses, and axial layouts. They appear in major temples like Thiên Mụ Pagoda (Chùa Thiên Mụ) in Huế, built in 1601 under the Nguyễn Lords. The hall lies within a complex of gates, bell towers, and shrines, reflecting Vietnamese adaptations of Chinese Buddhist norms. The hall may contain altars for Buddha, bodhisattvas, or local deities. At Thiên Mụ Pagoda, the Dharma Hall is part of a larger complex including a Main Shrine with Buddha images, Ksitigarbha Hall, and a stone stele carried by a tortoise. It is a UNESCO World Heritage site with a historic Dharma Hall and iconic octagonal tower.

== Gallery ==
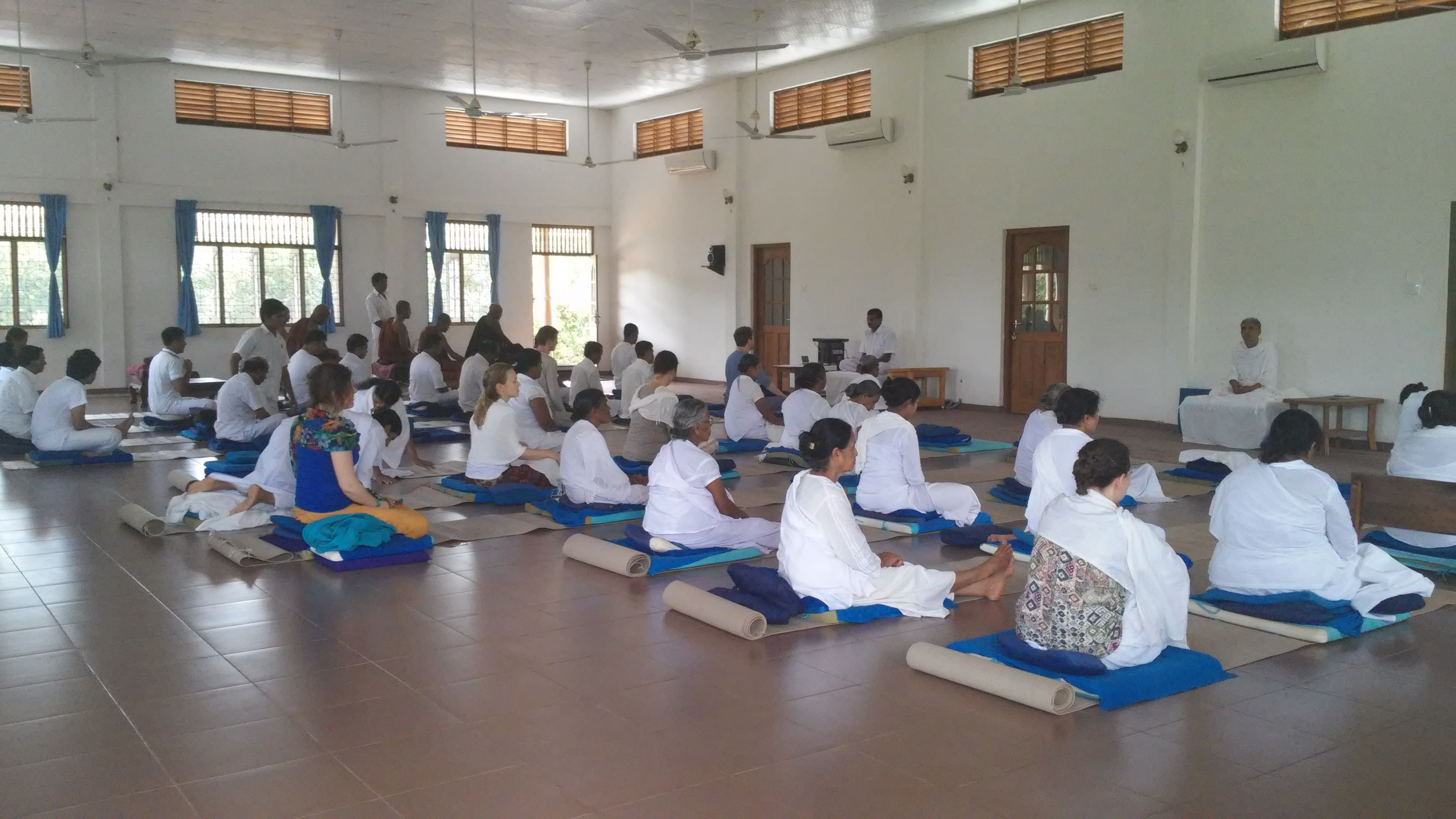
Dhamma Hall of Dhamma Anuradha Vipassana Center

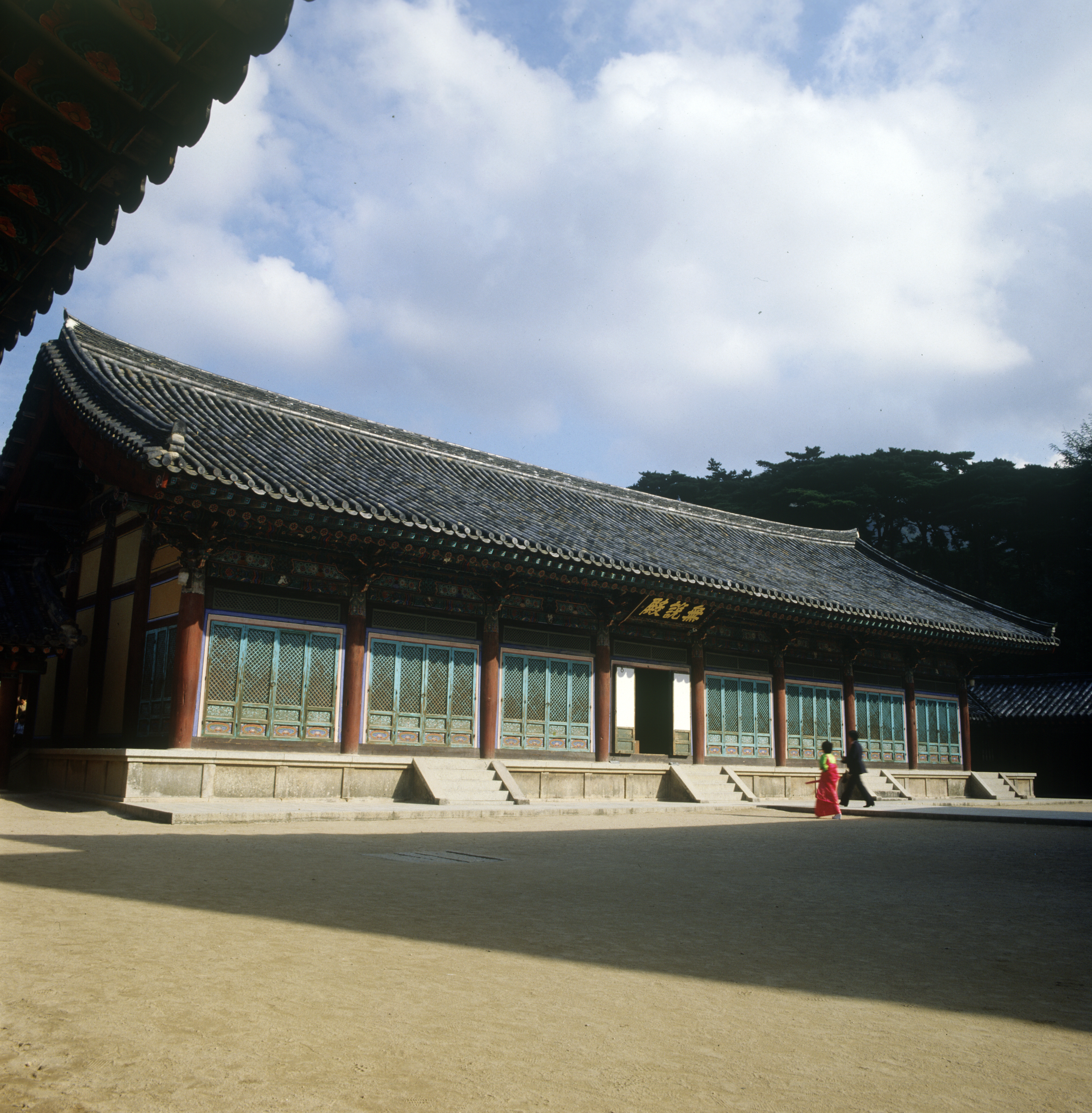
Museoljeon of Bulguksa
