= Sŏngjusa =

Former temple in Boryeong, South Korea

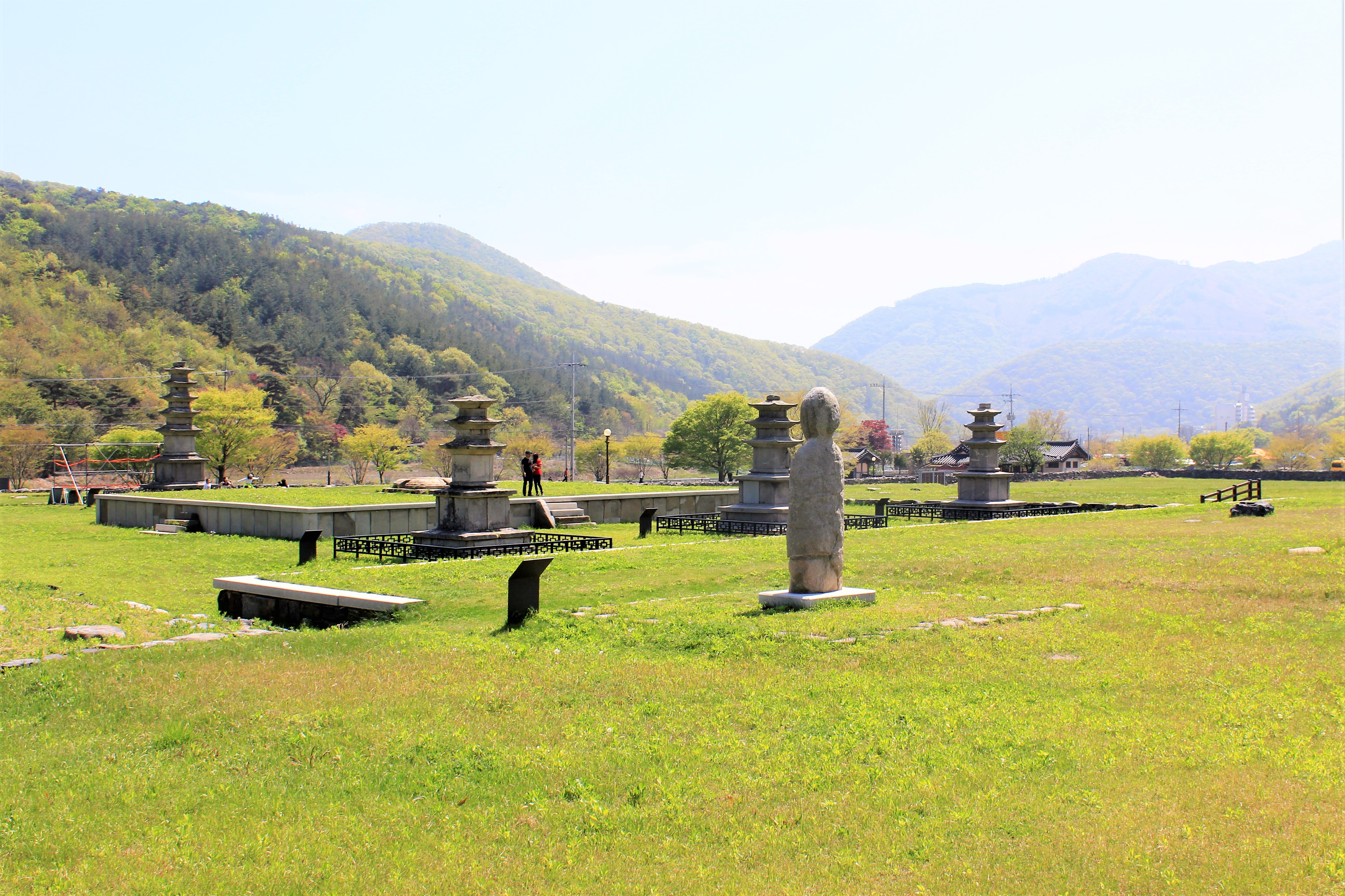
- Remains of the temple (2018)

Religion
- Affiliation: Korean Buddhism

Location
- Interactive map of Sŏngjusa
- Coordinates: 36.344267°N 126.655585°E

Architecture
- Historic Sites of South Korea
- Official name: Seongjusa Temple Site, Boryeong
- Designated: 1984-08-13
- Reference no.: 307

Sŏngjusa (Korean: 성주사; Hanja: 聖住寺; RR: Seongjusa) was a Baekje-era Buddhist temple in Boryeong, South Chungcheong Province, South Korea.

According to the Samguk sagi, the temple was built by King Beop around 600 and played a critical role as one of the nine mountain schools during the North South States Period. Much of it was destroyed during the 1592–1598 Imjin War. However, stele accompanying pagoda of Buddhist priest Nanghyehwasang still remains including pieces of Buddhist statue of Baekje and several roof tiles in the era of Unified Silla. The stele is registered as the national treasure of South Korea in the present time. The pagoda cherished the most fabulous architectural style with magnificent scale during Unified Silla.

The temple gained its historical fame given that the relics around all the era have been found until now from 7th century to Joseon Dynasty, which enables researchers the difference of designs of roof tiles and statue of Buddhism. The site itself was designated as historic relic with 1 national treasures, 2 treasure-level pagodas. From the excavation project, the site of original place was uncovered. For example, northwestern part of the site appeared to have had the pavilion including remaining monument.

== Gallery ==
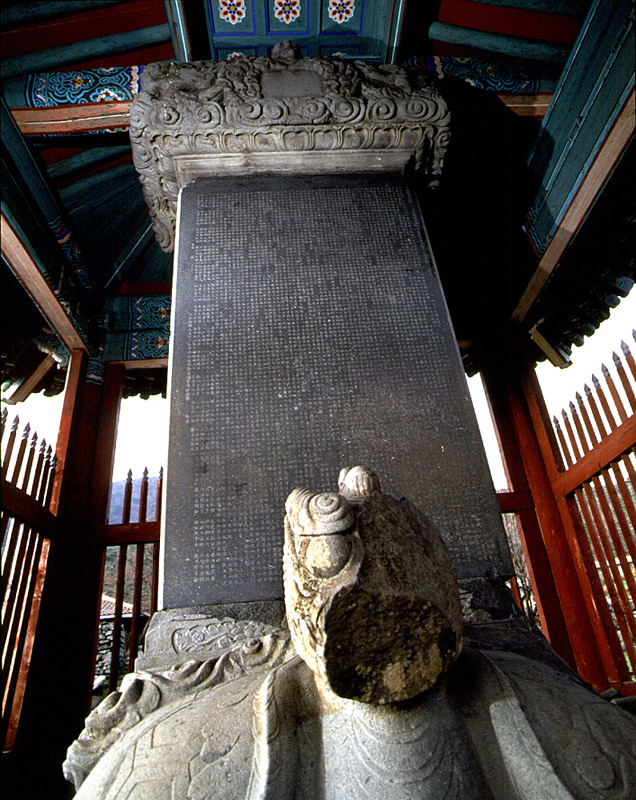
Priest Nanghye's commemorative stele

== See also ==
- National Treasures of South Korea
- Boryeong Mud Festival
