= Chilseongsin =

Korean deity

- Personification of the Big Dipper
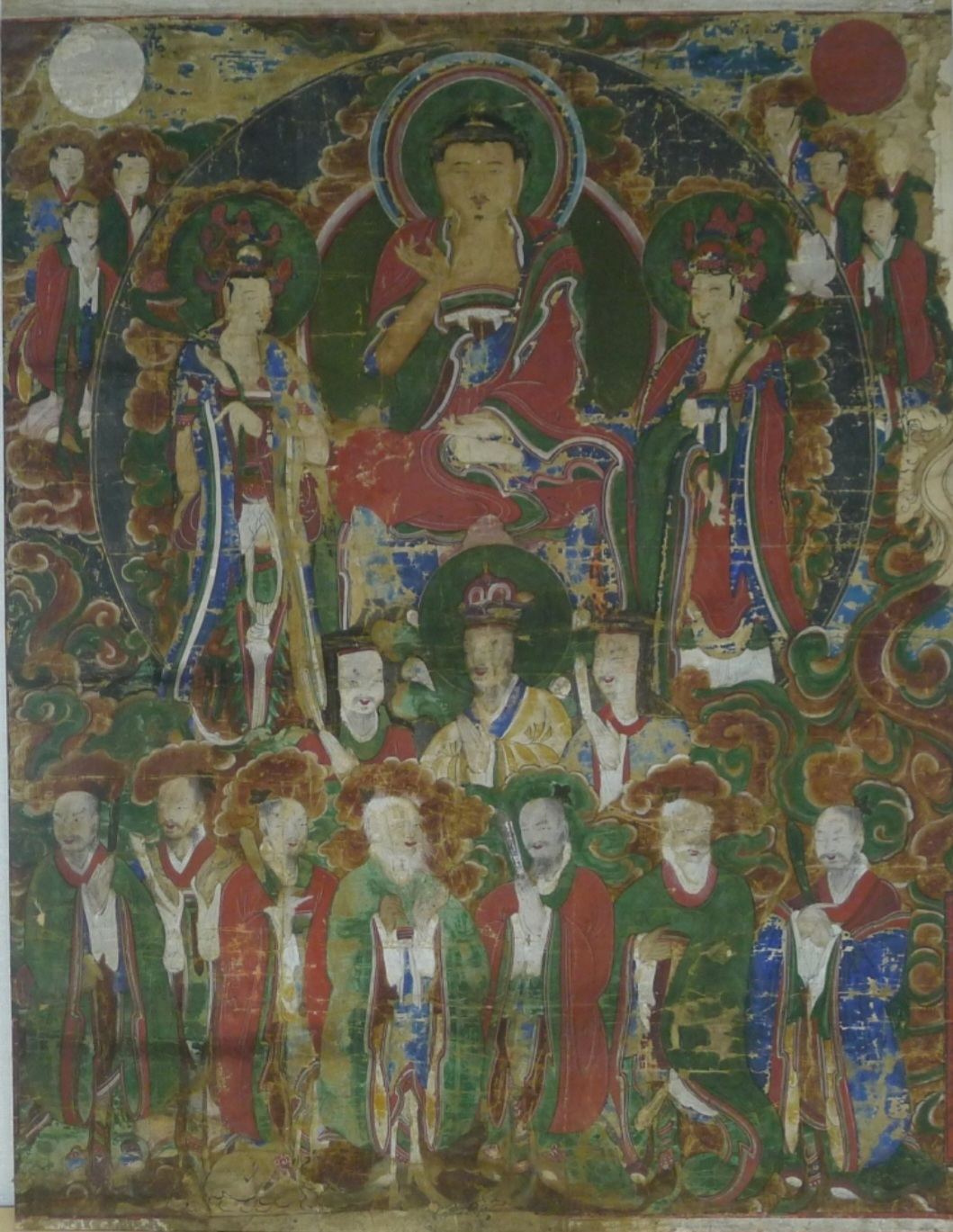
- Chilseongdo of Busan
- Other names: Chilseong

Korean name
- Hangul: 칠성신
- Hanja: 七星神
- RR: Chilseongsin
- MR: Ch'ilsŏngsin
- Venerated in: Korean Shamanism and Buddhism
- Gender: Male (Mainland); Female (Jeju)
- Temples: Chilseonggak and Samseonggak
- Associated deities: Eopsin

Equivalents
- Taoism: Chilwon Seonggun
- Buddhism: Chilyeorae

Chilseongsin (Korean: 칠성신; Hanja: 七星神; lit. 'seven star god') or Chilseong is a deity in Korean mythology who oversees rain or the longevity and wealth of humans. It is a personification of the Big Dipper (Bukdu Chilseong) and is usually worshipped in chilseonggak or samseonggak buildings in Korean Buddhist temples. It is considered a fusion of Korean shamanism, Buddhism, and Taoism.

Meanwhile, Eopsin of the mainland is called Chilseongsin in Jeju Island. It is in the form of a snake and is responsible for wealth. The snake deity is thought to be called Chilseong because its role of overseeing human life and fortune is similar to that of Bukdu Chilseong.

== Mainland ==
=== History ===
Chilwon Seonggun (칠원성군; 七元星君), a Taoist deification of the Big Dipper, was accepted in Buddhism and became Chilyeorae (칠여래; 七如來). The Taoist and Buddhist deities are thought to have merged with indigenous Big Dipper worship and became Chilseongsin.

In Goryeo and Joseon, Chilseongsin was worshipped during rainmaking. Faith in Chilseong spread during mid-Joseon when the lives of commoners became difficult after the Imjin War and Qing invasion of Joseon. During this time, chilseonggak unique to Korean Buddhist temples began to be built.

=== Depiction ===
In shamanic paintings, Chilseong is depicted as seven men with halos painted on the front of each figure's hat.

Buddhist paintings depicting the seven star deities are called Chilseongdo and are placed in chilseonggak. While there are several types of Chilseongdo, one type features Tejaprabhā Buddha in the center with Sūryaprabha and Candraprabha on the sides, Chilyeorae above, and Chilwon Seonggun below.

=== Worship and rituals ===
On Chilseok (7 July on the lunisolar calendar) night, women prepare food and wish for the well-being of the family. In North Chungcheong Province where the deity is believed to bring prosperity to the family, a jesa is held in the backyard under the leadership of women, usually the grandmother. Baekseolgi and a bowl of fresh water is offered on a mat. Then, a candle is lit and the leader bows toward the four cardinal directions before making wishes to the deity.

Chilseong gut is a shamanic ritual wishing for longevity. In Pyongan Province and Hwanghae Province, the ritual has Buddhist influences with the mudang wearing a kasaya over a jangsam (top of monks) while performing nianfo.

=== Mythology ===
A boy destined to die young approached Namdu Chilseong and Bukdu Chilseong when they were playing go. When he asked for longevity, Bukdu Chilseong extended his life.

== Jeju ==
=== Mythology ===
According to Chilseong bonpuri, a Chinese couple who had long been unable to have children were finally blessed with a daughter. When they left to work in the government, their daughter set out in search of them and met a monk, eventually becoming pregnant with his child. Enraged by this, her parents put her in a stone chest and set her adrift at sea. While drifting, she gave birth to seven snakes, all daughters, and also turned into one. When they arrived at Jocheon in Jeju, local haenyeo treated them with contempt and subsequently fell ill. However, after recognizing them as divine beings, they recovered from their illness and were rewarded with wealth. Later, among the eight snake deities, the youngest daughter became Batchilseong (밧칠성; outer Chilseong) and the mother became Anchilseong (안칠성; inner Chilseong).

=== Worship ===
External image
- Batchilseong

Anchilseong is enshrined in a gopang (grain storage) while Batchilseong is enshrined behind the house in a structure made by placing five grains under a roof tile and covering them with a woven straw mat.

== See also ==
- Big Dipper
- Eopsin
