= Ssangbongsa =

Buddhist temple in South Korea

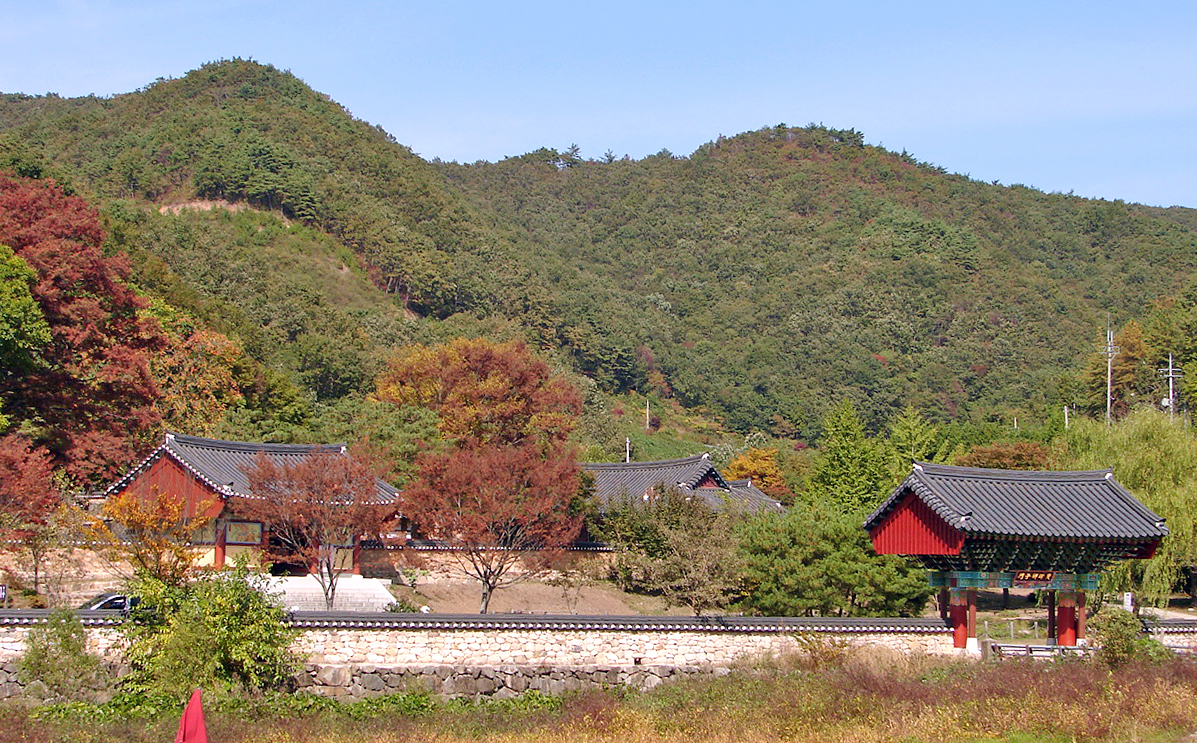
- Ssangbongsa sits below the twin mountain peaks giving the temple its name.

Religion
- Affiliation: Buddhism
- Sect: Jogye Order

Location
- Location: Jeung Village, Iyang Township, Hwasun County, South Jeolla Province, South Korea
- Country: South Korea
- Interactive map of Ssangbongsa
- Coordinates: 34°53′N 127°04′E

Korean name
- Hangul: 쌍봉사
- RR: Ssangbongsa
- MR: Ssangbongsa

Ssangbongsa (Korean: 쌍봉사), or Ssangbong Temple, is part of the Jogye Order of Korean Buddhism located in rural Jeung Village, Iyang Township, Hwasun County, South Jeolla Province, South Korea.

== Origins ==
Ssangbongsa was established by Zen Priest Cheolgam in 868 during the Unified Silla era.

'Ssang' means twin and 'Bong' means peak so Ssangbongsa derives its name from the pair of twin peaks on the mountain behind the temple.

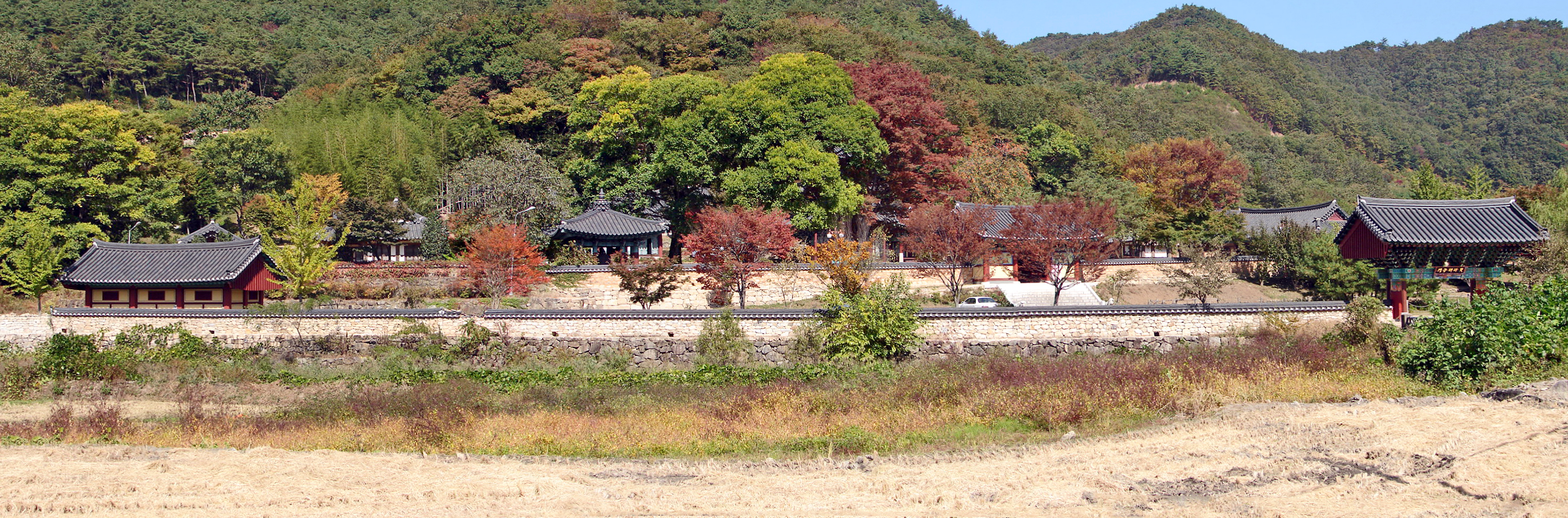
Ssangbong Temple complex in rural Hwasun County

== Treasures ==
=== Cheolgam Stupa ===
Cheolgam Stupa is an ornate octagonal stupa from the Unified Silla era that is an example of one of the finest stupas in Korea. The stupa stands at the back of a hill of to the west of the main Ssangbongsa grounds.

Cheolgam was born Park Do-yun and used the pen name Ssangbong. He was born at Hyuam in 789 to a powerful local family.

In 815, at the age of 17, Cheolgam enters the priesthood at Gwisinsa, located on Mount Moak in Gimje, one of the Hwaeom ten-temples, where he studies the Hwaeomgyeong Sutra for 10 years.

In 825, Cheolgam travels to Tang Dynasty to study under the Bowon Namjeon. After Namjeon passes away, Cheolgam remains for 13 more years before returning to Silla. He stays shortly at Jangdamsa, located on Mount Geumgang, before moving to Ssangbongsa in 855 where he passes away in 868.

Cheolgam's Stupa is National Treasure #57.

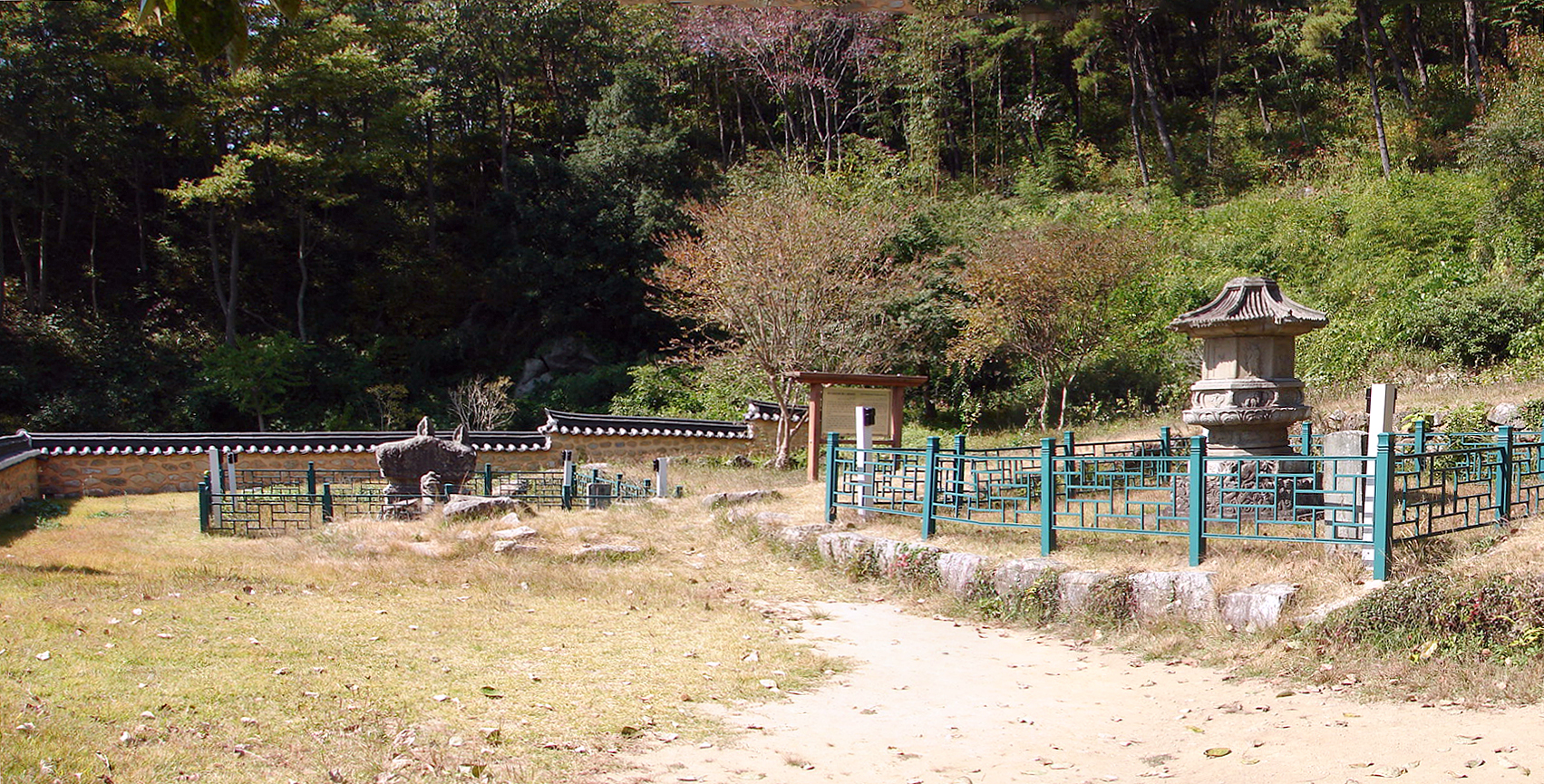
Ssangbongsa Cheolgam Monument (left) and Cheolgam Stupa (right) on the hillside west of the main Ssangbongsa temple complex

=== Cheolgam Monument ===
Cheolgam Monument records the high priest's work from birth to death.

Monuments normally are built besides stupas and consist of a base shaped like a turtle, a tombstone, and a cap stone.

This granite monument stands beside the Cheolgam Stupa, but only the base shaped like a turtle and a head, without the tombstone, remain. The base, with a cloud-pattern and upside-down 32 lotus leaves engraved in a typical Unified Silla, stands 1.4m/4.6 ft high. In the center of turtle's back is a place, for the tombstone, in the shape of a rectangle.

Chinese characters show that this is Cheolgam's Monument.

Cheolgam Monument is Treasure #170.

== Features ==
=== Wooden Three Story Pagoda at Ssangbongsa ===
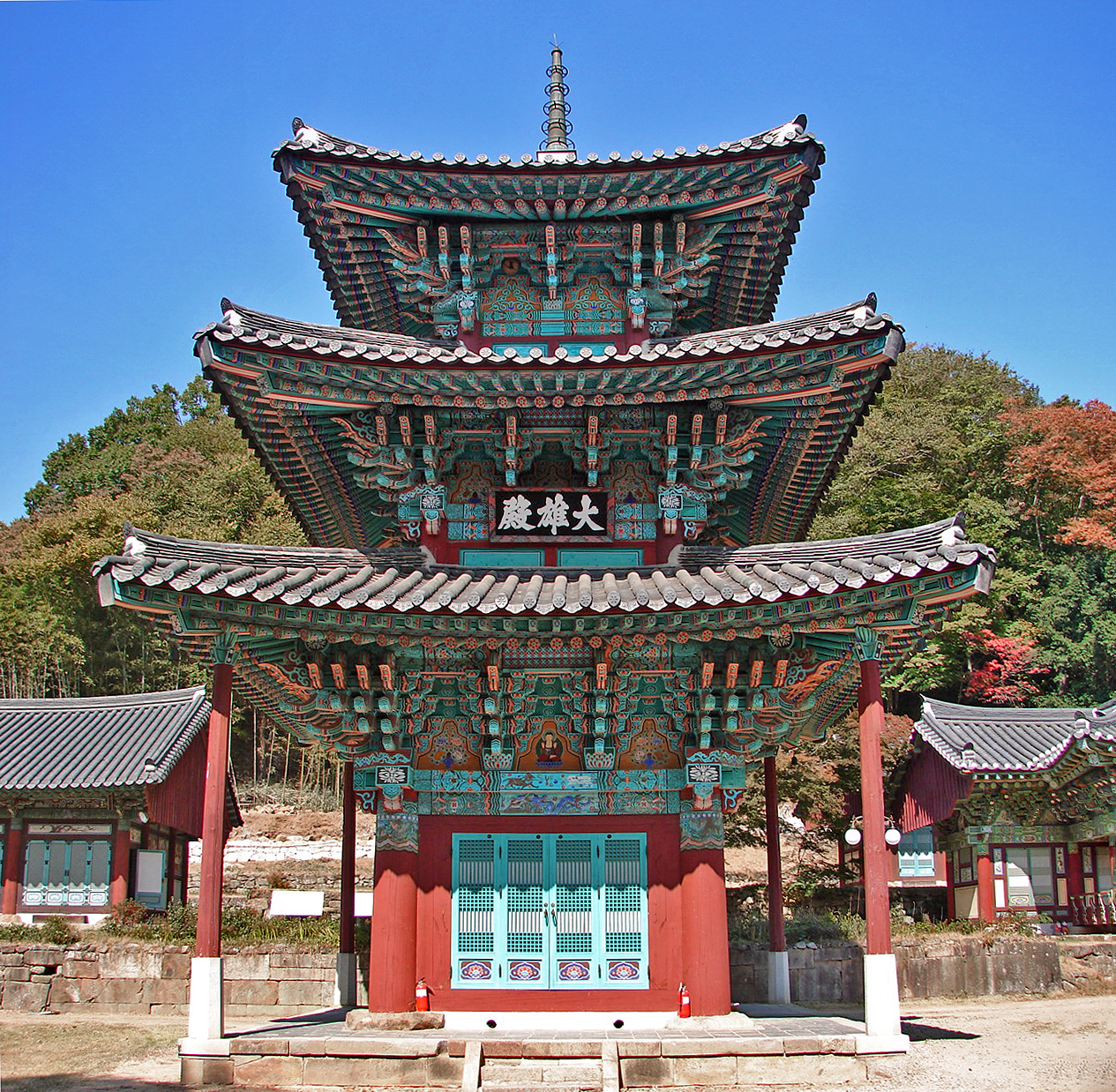
Ssangbongsa Daeungjeon

A Daeungjeon is a hall having a Seokgayeorae (a figure of Buddha). Most Daeungjeon house Hyeopsi Bosal, Munsu Bosal, Boyeon Bosal or Gwanuem Bosal and Mireuk Bosal. However, Ssangbongsa's Daeungjeon has only Ananjonja and Gaseopjonja, Buddha's disciples in addition to Seokgayeorae.

Until recently, there were only two wooden pagodas remaining, preserved in Korea as cultural heritage objects - the Palsangjeon (hall) at the Beopjusa and the Daeungjeon (hall) here at the Ssangbongsa.

Daeungjeon at Ssangbongsa is a square-shaped three-story building that was built in the middle of the Joseon Dynasty. This is a very rare style of wooden pagoda found in Korea, along with Palsangjeon at Beopjusa, Mireukjeon in Gimje, North Jeolla Province, and the three-story wooden pagoda at Botapsa in Jincheon County, North Chungcheong Province.

Daeungjeon at Ssangbongsa is used as the main worship hall.

A worshiper celebrating Buddha's Birthday tripped over a candle in Ssangbongsa Daeungjeon accidentally burning down in 1984. Daeungjeon was subsequently rebuilt.

== Gallery ==
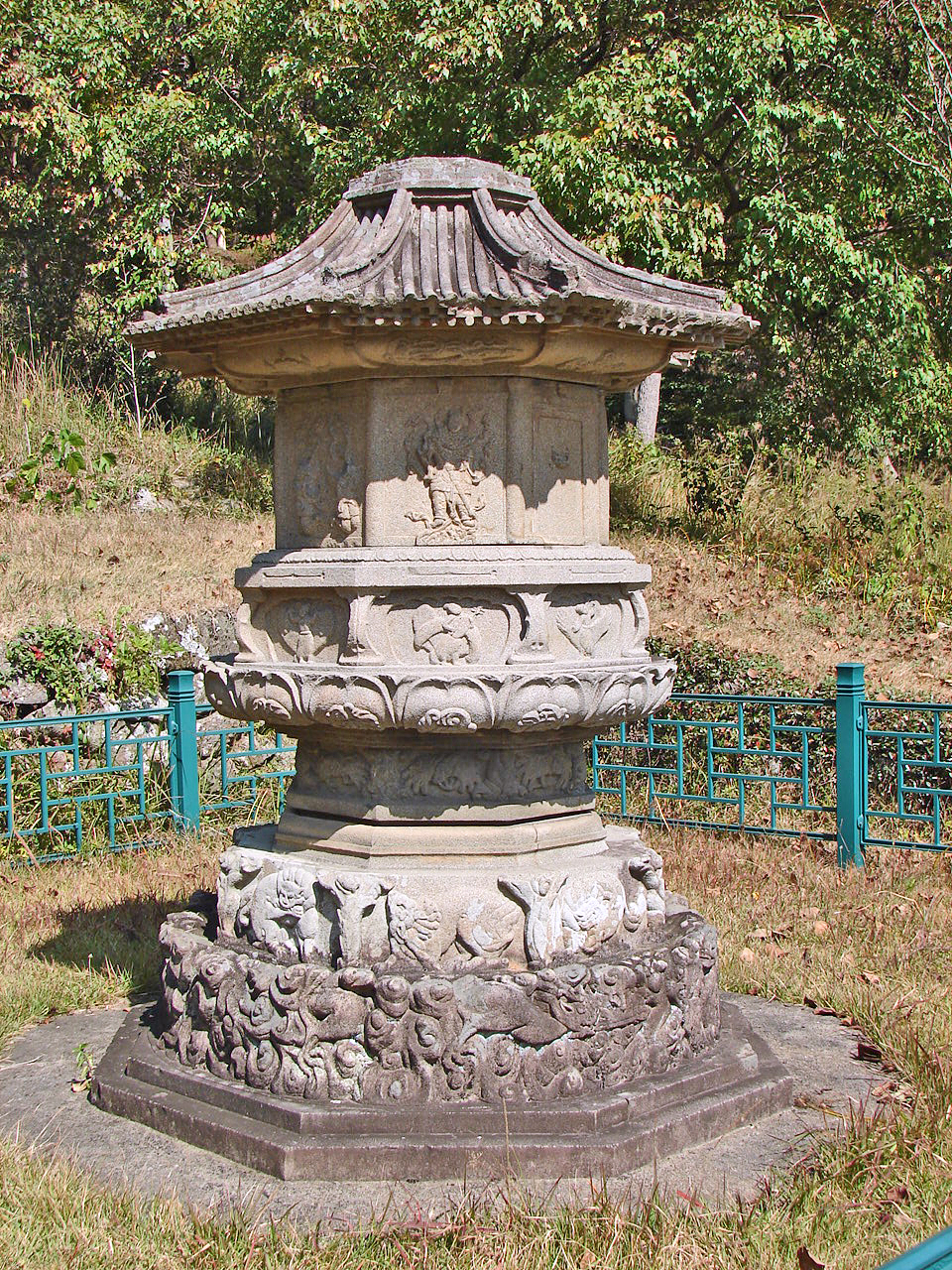
Cheolgam's Stupa is National Treasure #57.

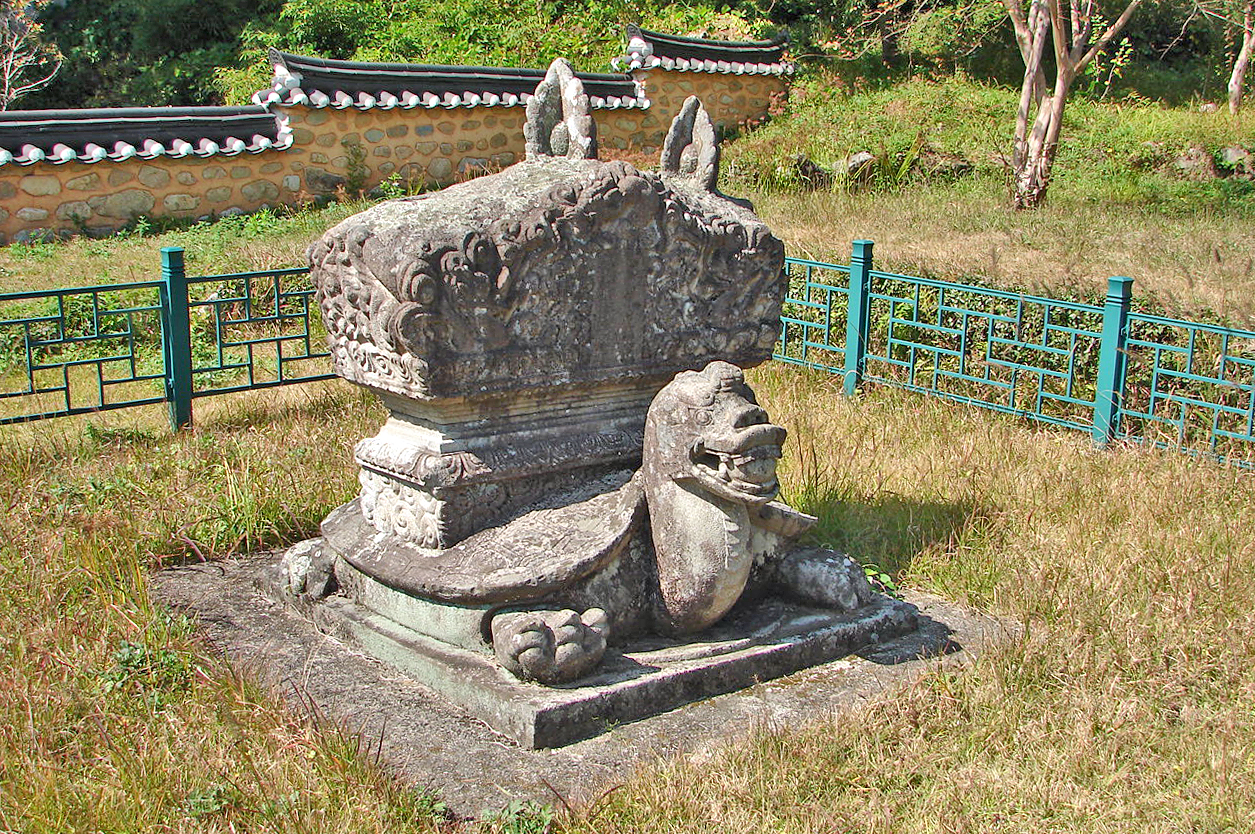
Cheolgam Monument is Treasure #170.

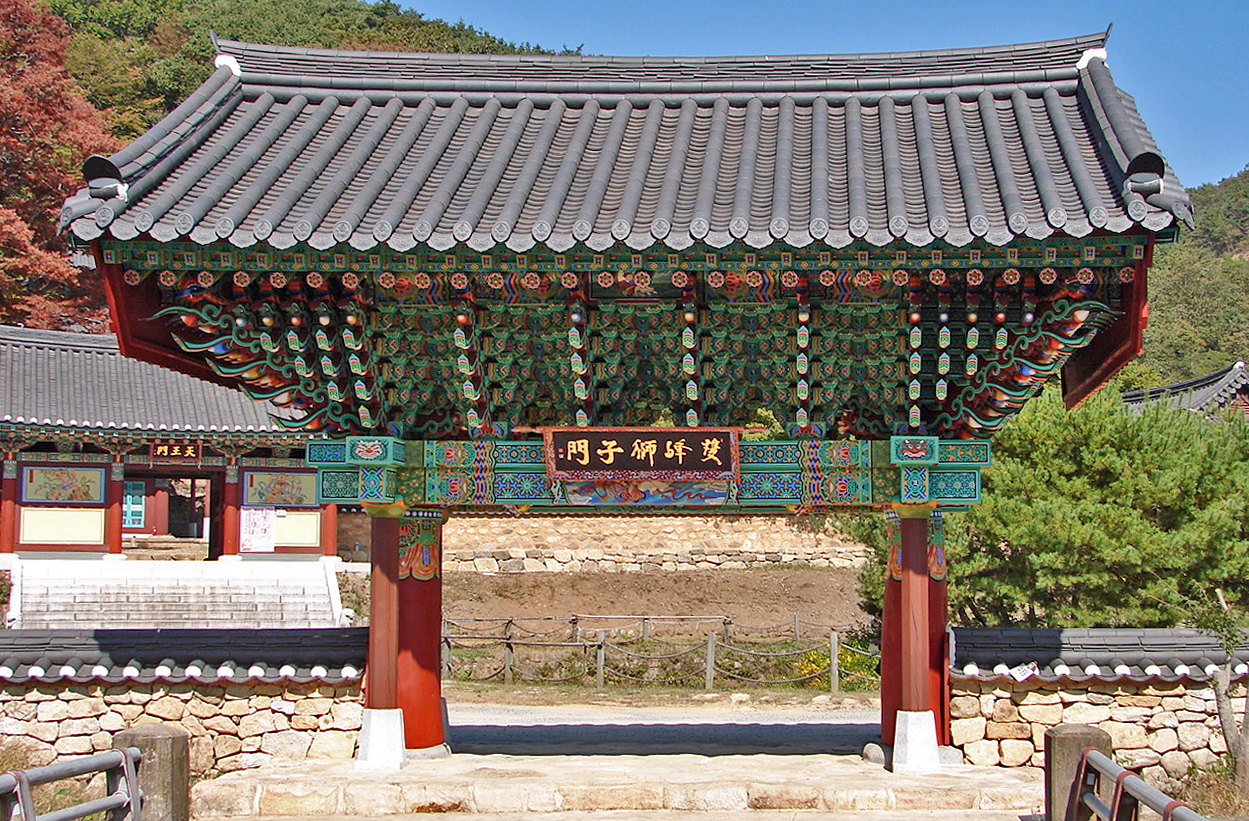
Ssangbongsa Iljumun (One Pillar Gate).

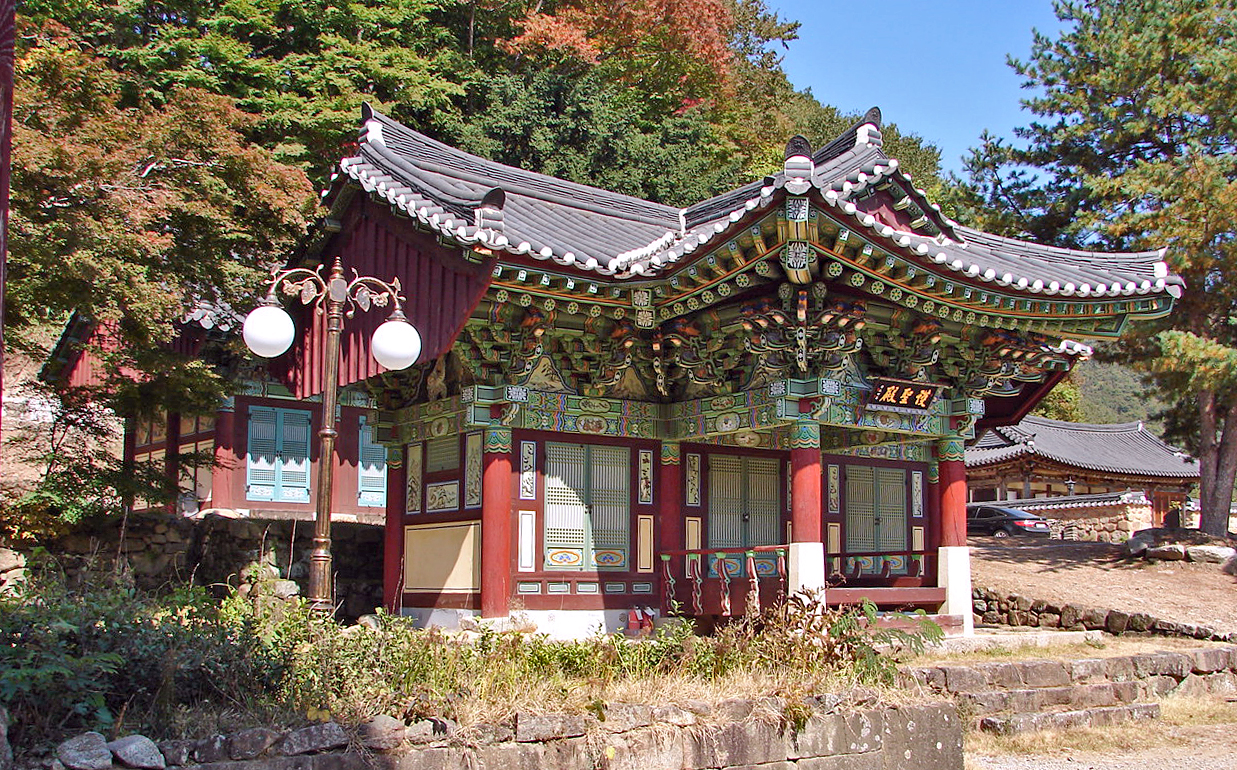
One of the worship halls.

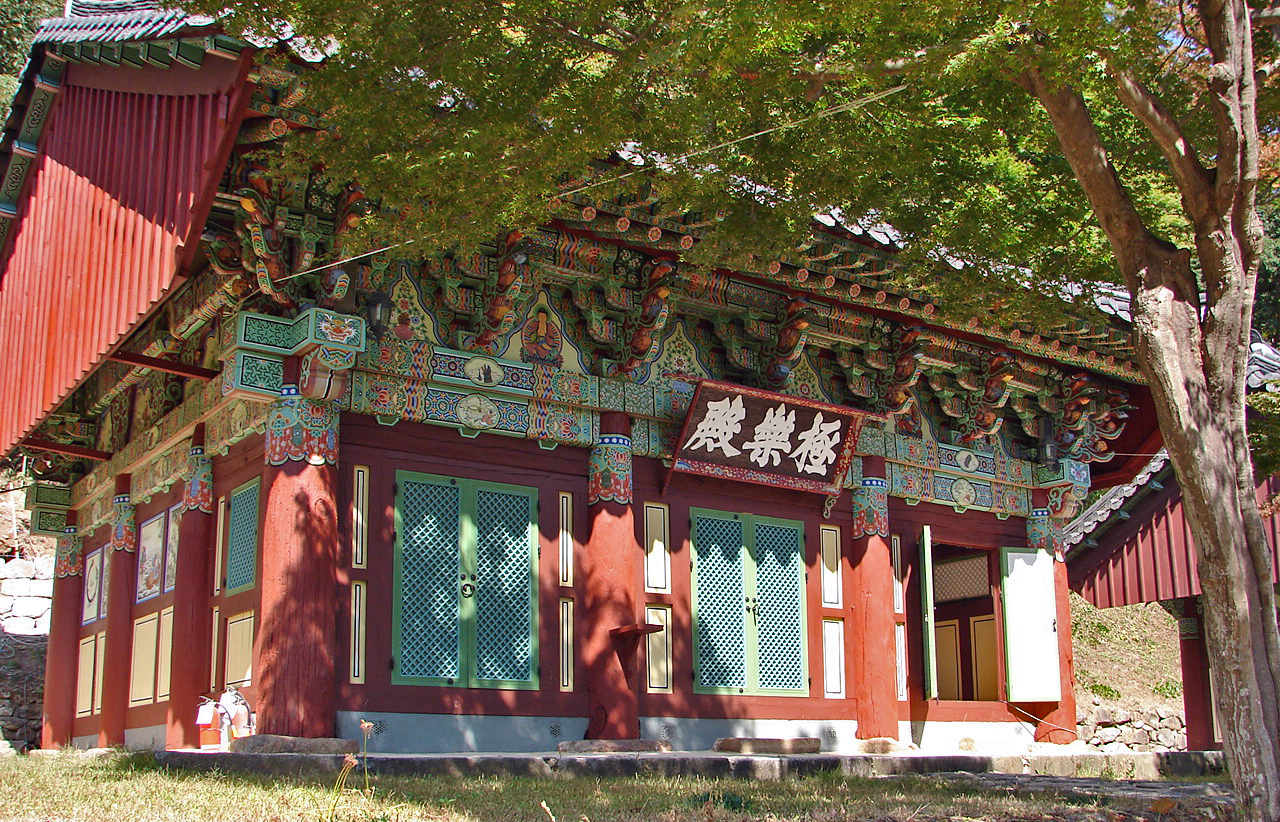
One of the worship halls.

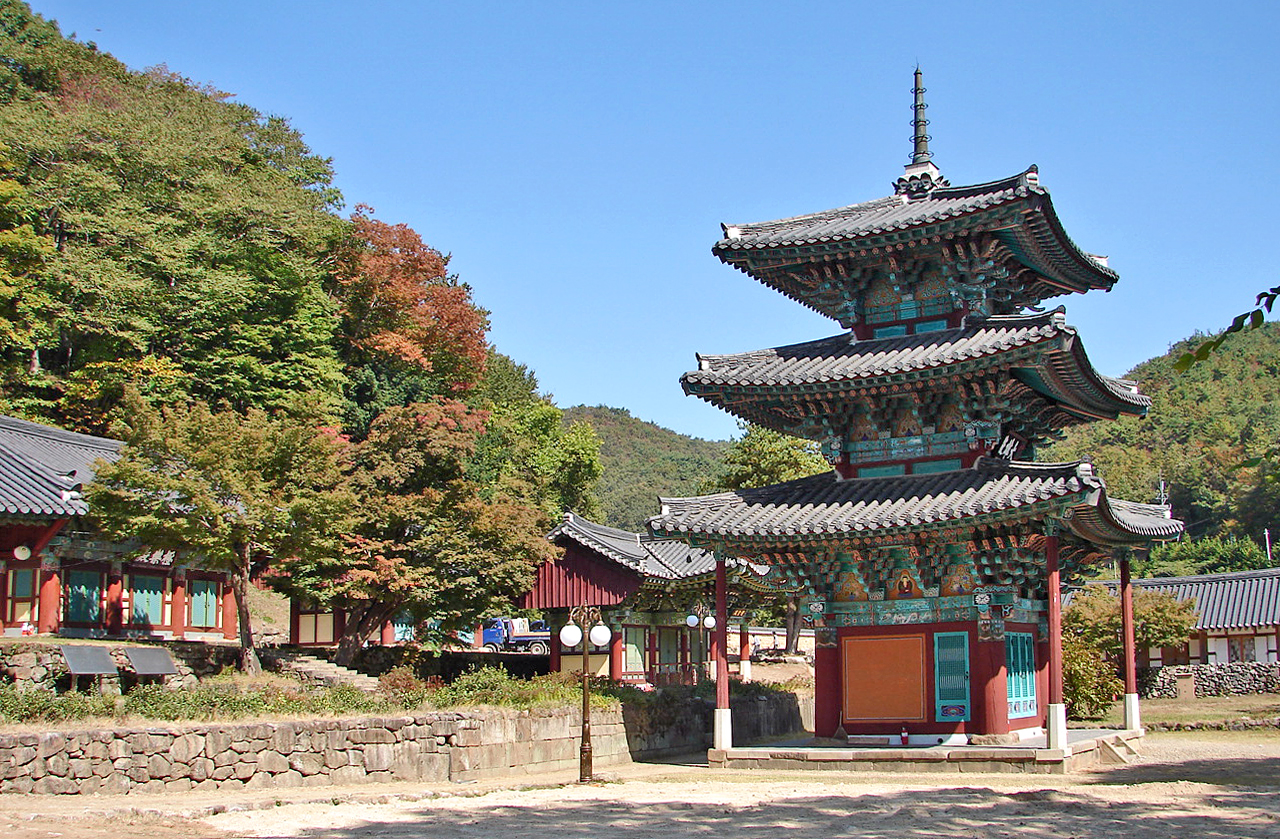
Ssangbongsa Daeungjeon.

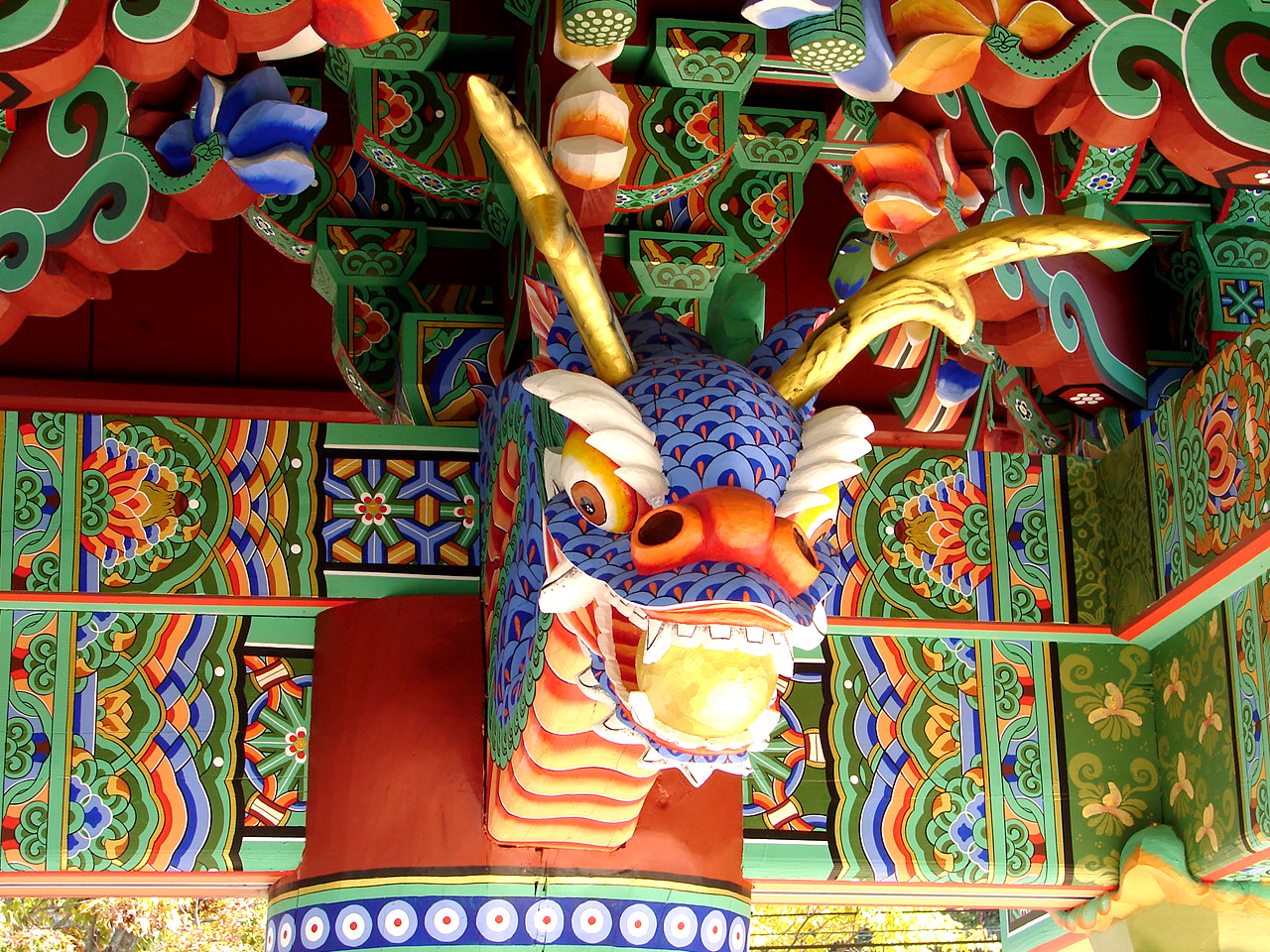
Dancheong on Ssangbongsa's Iljumun

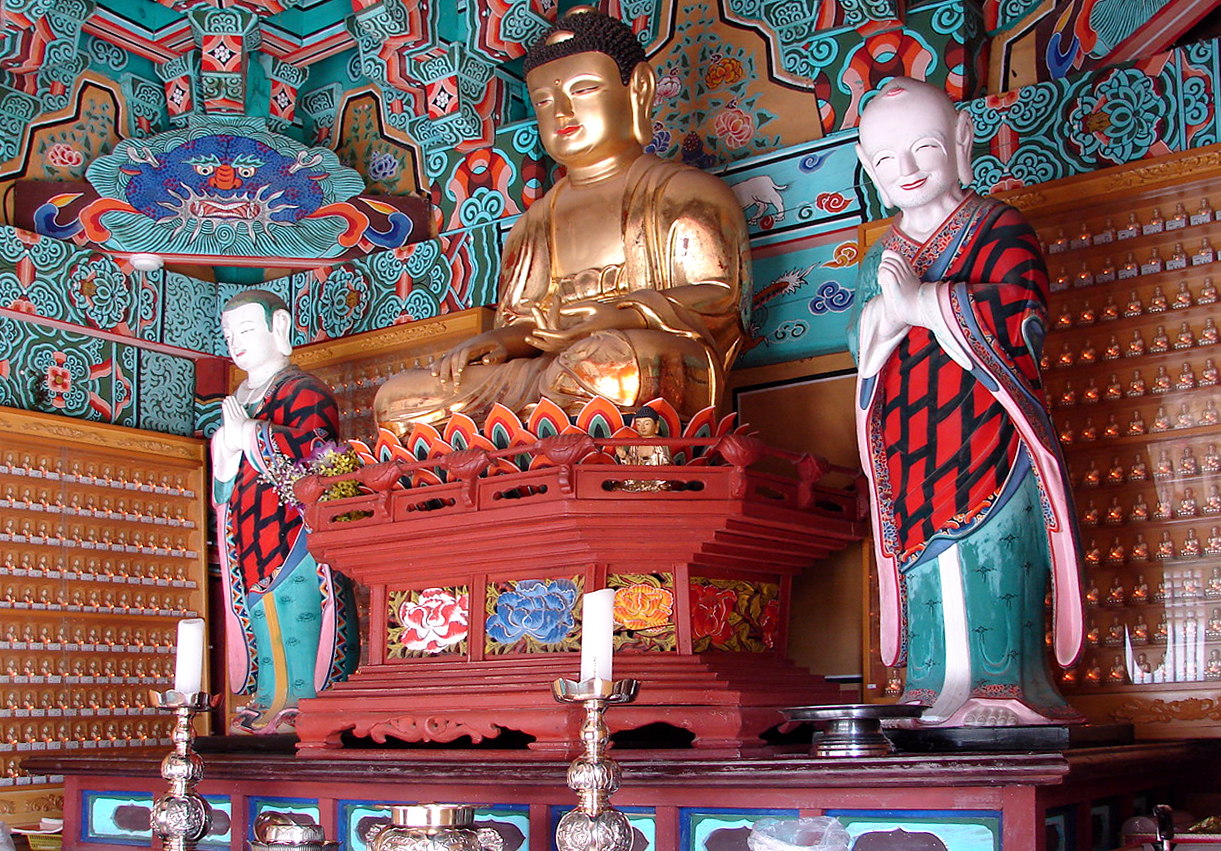
Ssangbongsa Daeungjeon Interior.

External videos
- Ssangbongsa Video Slideshow
- Temple in Korea, Ssangbongsa
