= Boeun County =

County in North Chungcheong Province, South Korea

Coordinates: 36°29′04″N 127°43′07″E

Boeun
- County
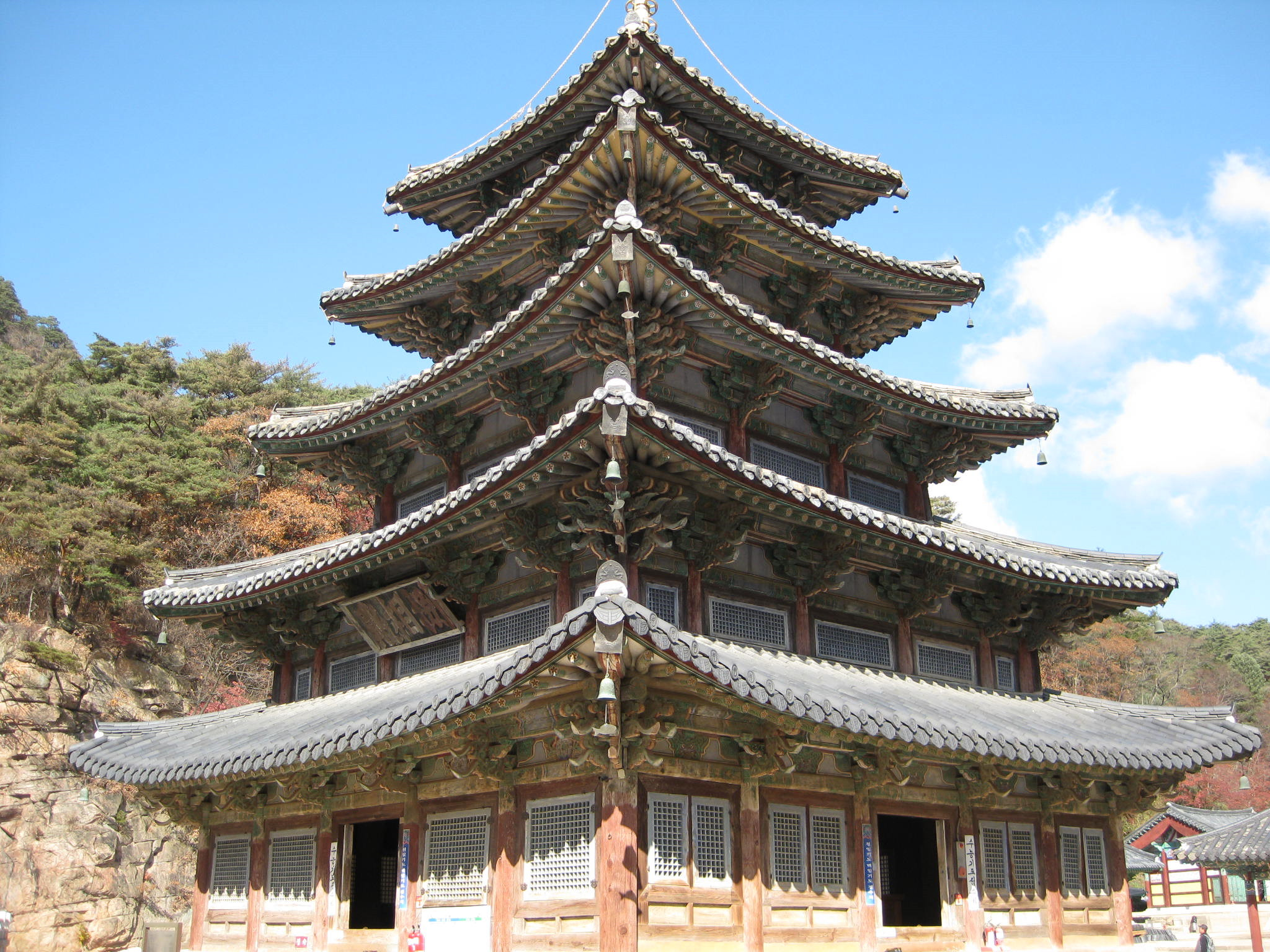
- Palsangjeon Hall at Beopjusa

- Flag

- Location in South Korea
- Country: South Korea
- Region: Hoseo
- Administrative divisions: 1 eup, 10 myeon

Government
  - Mayor: Choi Jae-hyeong (최재형)

Area
  - Total: 584.26 km^{2} (225.58 sq mi)

Population (2024)
  - Total: 30,620
  - Density: 52/km^{2} (130/sq mi)
  - Dialect: Chungcheong

Korean name
- Hangul: 보은군
- Hanja: 報恩郡
- RR: Boeun-gun
- MR: Poŭn-gun

Boeun County (Korean: 보은군) is a county in North Chungcheong Province, South Korea.

== History ==
Boeun (literally "offering gratitude" or "thanksgiving"), was a South Korean town named in 1406 by a remorseful King Taejong, who felt relieved that he had cleared his conscience after having participated in a ceremonial ritual at the local Beopjusa temple to appease the spirits of his dead younger half-brothers, whose deaths he had caused in a power struggle years earlier.

In July 1973, Boeun township was elevated to the status of Boeun town. In 1983, two townships were abolished and incorporated into normal ones. In 2007, Hoebuk-myeon changed its name to Hoein-myeon, Oesongni-myeon to Jangan-myeon, and Naesonngni-myeon into Songnisan-myeonn.

== Festivals ==
- Songnisan Fall Festival: During autumn a festival is held at Songnisan, a celebrated mountain in central Korea. The festival has been an important contributor to the development of tourism and the economy in the region.
- Boeun Ocher Apple Festival: Boeun County is well known for its apples, for which a major festival is held to promote them.

== Products ==
Jujube is the most well-known agricultural product in Boeun county. Additionally, the county's fruit, and eggs are growing in popularity thanks to their eco-friendly mark.

== Climate ==
Boeun has a monsoon-influenced humid continental climate (Köppen: Dwa) with cold, dry winters and hot, rainy summers.

Climate data for Boeun (1991–2020 normals, extremes 1972–present)
Month	Jan	Feb	Mar	Apr	May	Jun	Jul	Aug	Sep	Oct	Nov	Dec	Year
Record high °C (°F)	14.4 (57.9)	21.9 (71.4)	26.2 (79.2)	31.2 (88.2)	34.2 (93.6)	34.2 (93.6)	37.3 (99.1)	38.2 (100.8)	32.8 (91.0)	29.5 (85.1)	25.1 (77.2)	17.4 (63.3)	38.2 (100.8)
Mean daily maximum °C (°F)	3.2 (37.8)	6.0 (42.8)	11.9 (53.4)	18.8 (65.8)	23.8 (74.8)	27.1 (80.8)	28.9 (84.0)	29.5 (85.1)	25.4 (77.7)	20.1 (68.2)	12.8 (55.0)	5.3 (41.5)	17.7 (63.9)
Daily mean °C (°F)	−2.9 (26.8)	−0.6 (30.9)	4.8 (40.6)	11.2 (52.2)	16.7 (62.1)	21.1 (70.0)	24.0 (75.2)	24.3 (75.7)	19.1 (66.4)	12.2 (54.0)	5.6 (42.1)	−1.0 (30.2)	11.2 (52.2)
Mean daily minimum °C (°F)	−8.4 (16.9)	−6.6 (20.1)	−1.8 (28.8)	3.7 (38.7)	9.8 (49.6)	15.7 (60.3)	20.3 (68.5)	20.4 (68.7)	14.0 (57.2)	6.0 (42.8)	−0.3 (31.5)	−6.4 (20.5)	5.5 (41.9)
Record low °C (°F)	−25.4 (−13.7)	−21.9 (−7.4)	−18.3 (−0.9)	−7.4 (18.7)	−1.2 (29.8)	4.6 (40.3)	10.4 (50.7)	9.4 (48.9)	0.8 (33.4)	−7.0 (19.4)	−12.3 (9.9)	−20.4 (−4.7)	−25.4 (−13.7)
Average precipitation mm (inches)	23.4 (0.92)	33.0 (1.30)	47.5 (1.87)	82.2 (3.24)	92.8 (3.65)	156.4 (6.16)	306.0 (12.05)	296.6 (11.68)	137.4 (5.41)	56.6 (2.23)	45.2 (1.78)	28.2 (1.11)	1,305.3 (51.39)
Average precipitation days (≥ 0.1 mm)	7.3	6.7	8.2	8.5	8.1	9.5	16.7	14.7	9.3	6.1	8.1	8.2	111.4
Average snowy days	8.9	6.7	2.8	0.2	0.0	0.0	0.0	0.0	0.0	0.2	2.0	6.6	27.2
Average relative humidity (%)	66.6	63.1	59.9	58.2	62.8	69.2	76.8	77.4	76.7	73.9	70.5	68.9	68.7
Mean monthly sunshine hours	167.0	178.0	211.5	223.6	243.9	206.0	159.5	177.4	178.5	195.5	158.4	157.8	2,257.1
Percentage possible sunshine	55.9	58.2	57.4	59.5	57.0	49.7	40.1	46.4	51.3	59.9	53.8	54.0	53.2
Source: Korea Meteorological Administration (snow and percent sunshine 1981–2010)

== Symbols ==
- City Flower: Forsythia
- City Tree: Jujube tree
- City Bird: Magpie Birds

== Twin towns – sister cities ==
Boeun is twinned with:

- Gwangjin-gu, Seoul
- Clarence-Rockland, Canada
