= Yeongsanjeon =

Building storing palsangdo in Korean Buddhist temples

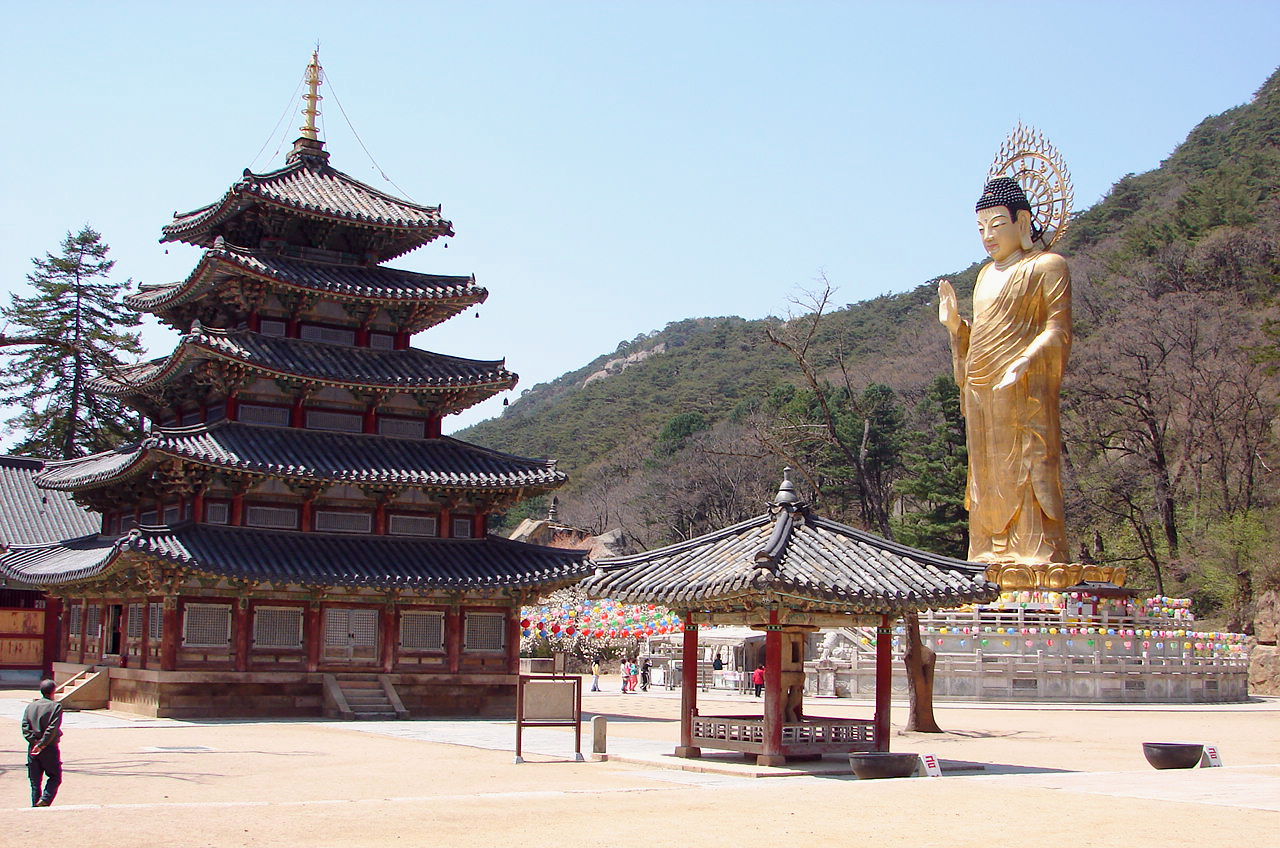
- Palsangjeon of Beopjusa

Korean name
- Hangul: 영산전
- Hanja: 靈山殿
- RR: yeongsanjeon
- MR: yŏngsanjŏn

Yeongsanjeon (Korean: 영산전; Hanja: 靈山殿) or palsangjeon (팔상전; 捌相殿) is a worship hall found at Korean Buddhist temples that contains the palsangdo, the series of painted murals depicting the eight stages in the life of the historic Buddha, Sakyamuni.

Though configurations for the paintings can vary, the most common is:

1. Descending from Tusita Heaven
2. Preparing for Birth
3. Birth
4. Leaving Home
5. Overcoming Mara, the Spirit of Evil
6. Achieving Enlightenment
7. Teaching the Dharma
8. Entering Nirvana

Palsang can also be found painted on the external walls of a temple worship hall. These external renderings tend to be less ornate than those contained within the walls of a Palsangjeon.

== Examples ==
=== Beopjusa Palsangjeon ===
Beopjusa Palsangjeon (Hall of Eight Pictures) at Beopjusa (temple) 36.5419412°N 127.8332555°E, believed to be the oldest in Korea, is one of only two wooden pagodas left in Korea, the other being the Daeungjeon at Ssangbongsa.

Although all historical records have been lost, two inscriptions were discovered during a major restoration completed in 1968, indicating Beopjusa Palsangjeon was originally built at the time of the founding of Beopjusa in 553. But like many other wooden buildings, was destroyed by the Japanese during the Seven-Year War. Rebuilding began in 1605 and was completed 21 years later in 1626. The dates of the rebuilding come from inscriptions on a sarira casket and roof that were discovered when the building went through an extensive renovation in 1968.

The pagoda at 22.7 m (74 ft) in height and its base covers an area of 8 square meters (86 square feet) is the highest in Korea. The eight painted panels depicting the life of Buddha adorn the four interior walls. A sarira containing relics of the Buddha or a holy person, a shrine for the Buddha, and an area for meditation also occupy the interior.

The pagoda rests on a low stone platform with centered steps and entrance on each of the four cardinal directions. The first and second floors contain five rooms while the third and fourth floors contain three. The fifth floor holds two rooms. In addition to the eight painted panels, there are fours statues of the Sakyamuni Buddha. Each statue has different hand positions. The Buddha facing east is in the fearless position. The Buddha facing west is Turning the Wheel of Dharma. The Buddha facing south is touching the earth and the Buddha facing north is in the reclining position (the Buddha's final state of enlightenment before his death). Within the pagoda hall can also be found 500 small white statues of the Buddha, or disciples of Buddha.

Although generally acknowledged to be a pagoda, some scholars suggest that this is a hybrid of pagoda and worship hall architecture. Because pagoda architecture was brought from Korea to Japan, some hypothesize that the original Palsangjeon may have inspired and resembled the five-story pagoda at Horyu-ji.

Beopjusa Palsangjeon is National Treasure of Korea #55 and was designated such on December 20, 1962.

=== Beomeosa Palsangjeon ===
Beomeosa Palsangjeon (Hall of Eight Pictures) at Beomeosa (temple) 35.283445°N 129.0678388°E is one of three halls identified as being in the single structure called the Hall of Three Shrines, or the Arhat's Hall.

Records indicate that Beomeosa's Palsangjeon was originally built in 1705 but it is believed the current building that houses Beomeosa Palsangjeon, along with Beomeosa Dokseongjeon (Shrine of the Lonely Saint) and the Beomeosa Nahanjeon (The Shrine of the Sixteen Arhats) was erected sometime in the Late Joseon Era. This arrangement found at Beomeosa is not typical for a Palsangjeon.

== Gallery ==
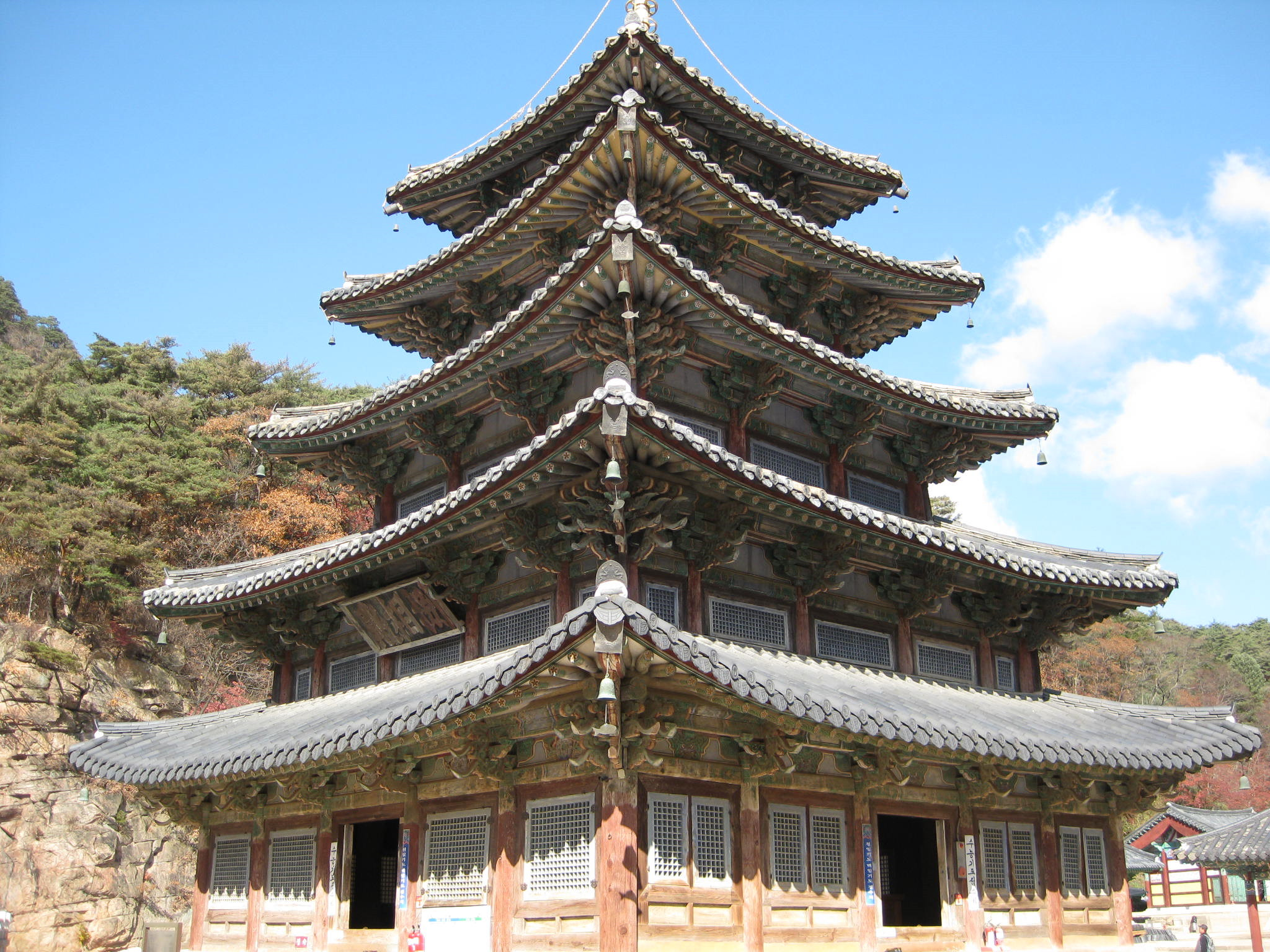
Beopjusa's five story wooden pagoda Palsangjeon

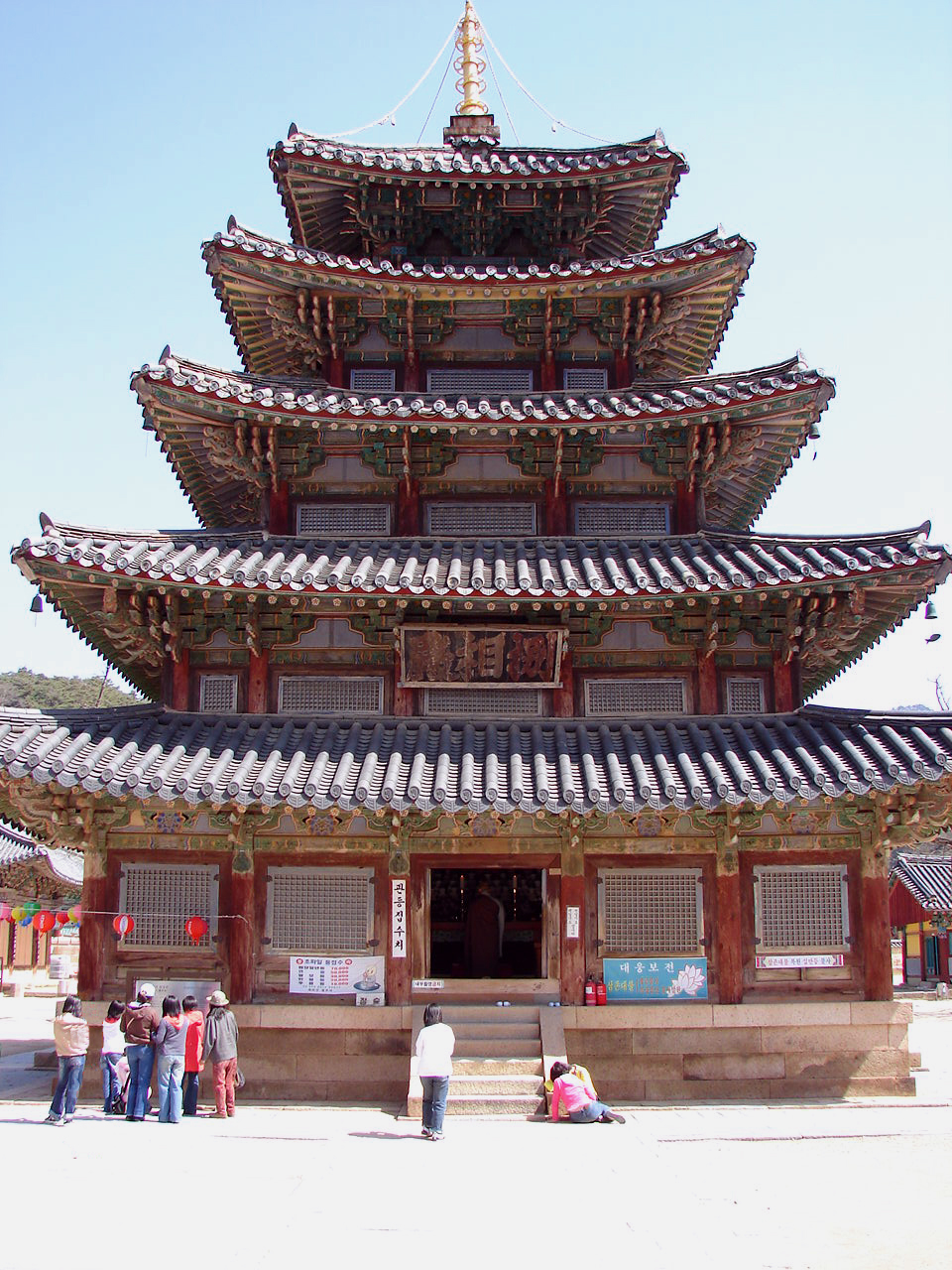
Beopjusa's five story wooden pagoda Palsangjeon

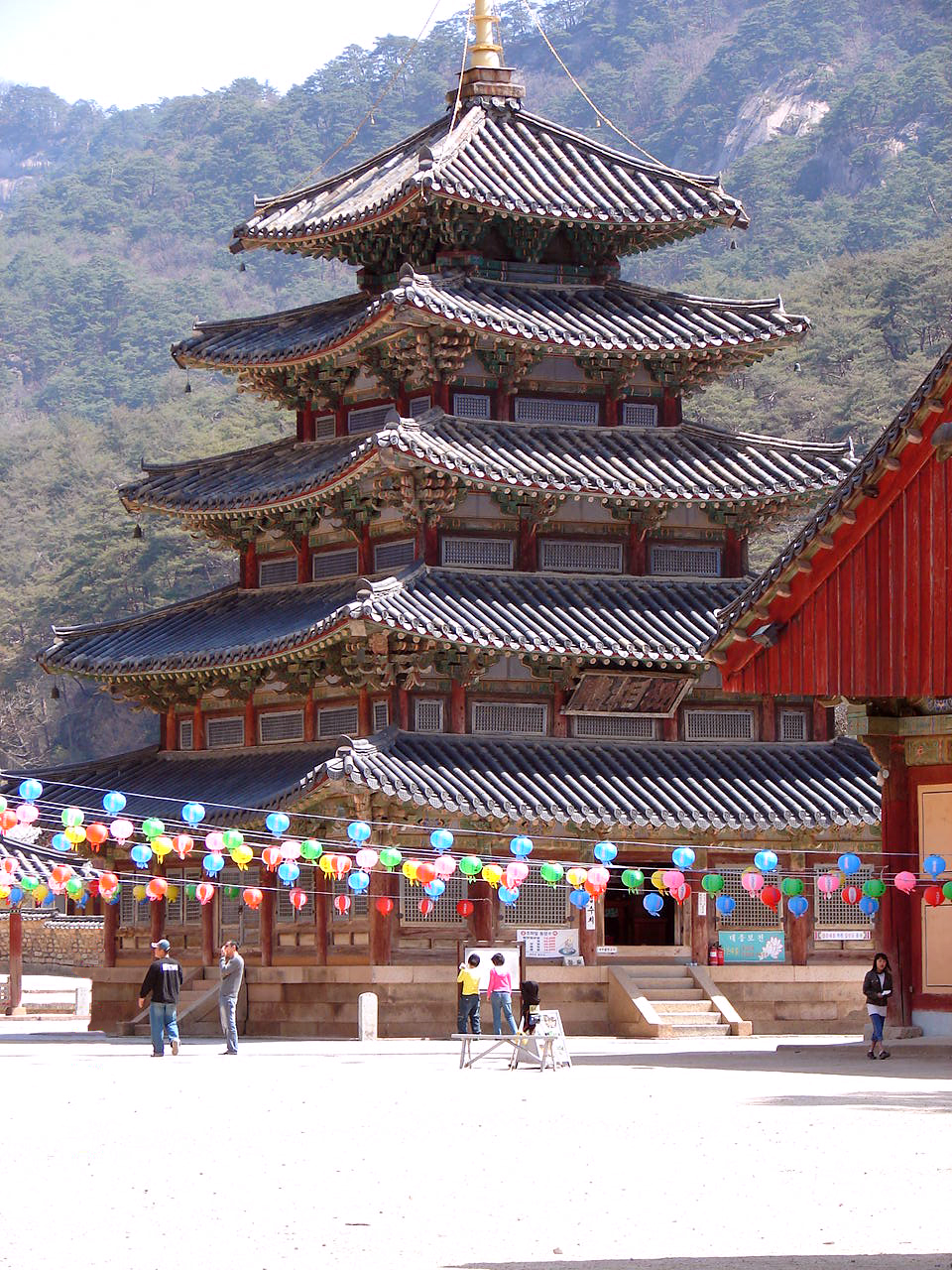
Beopjusa's five story wooden pagoda Palsangjeon

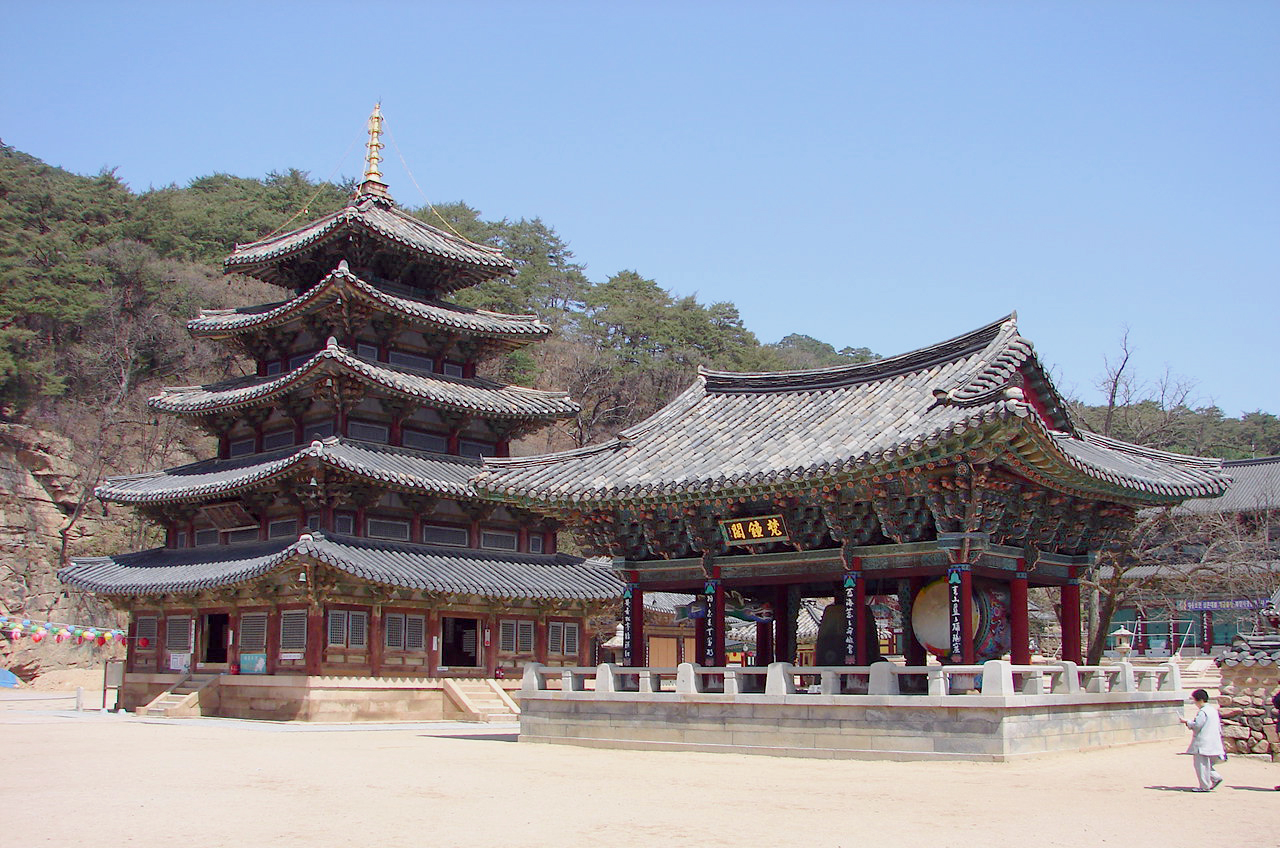
Beopjusa's five story wooden pagoda Palsangjeon and Bell Pavilion

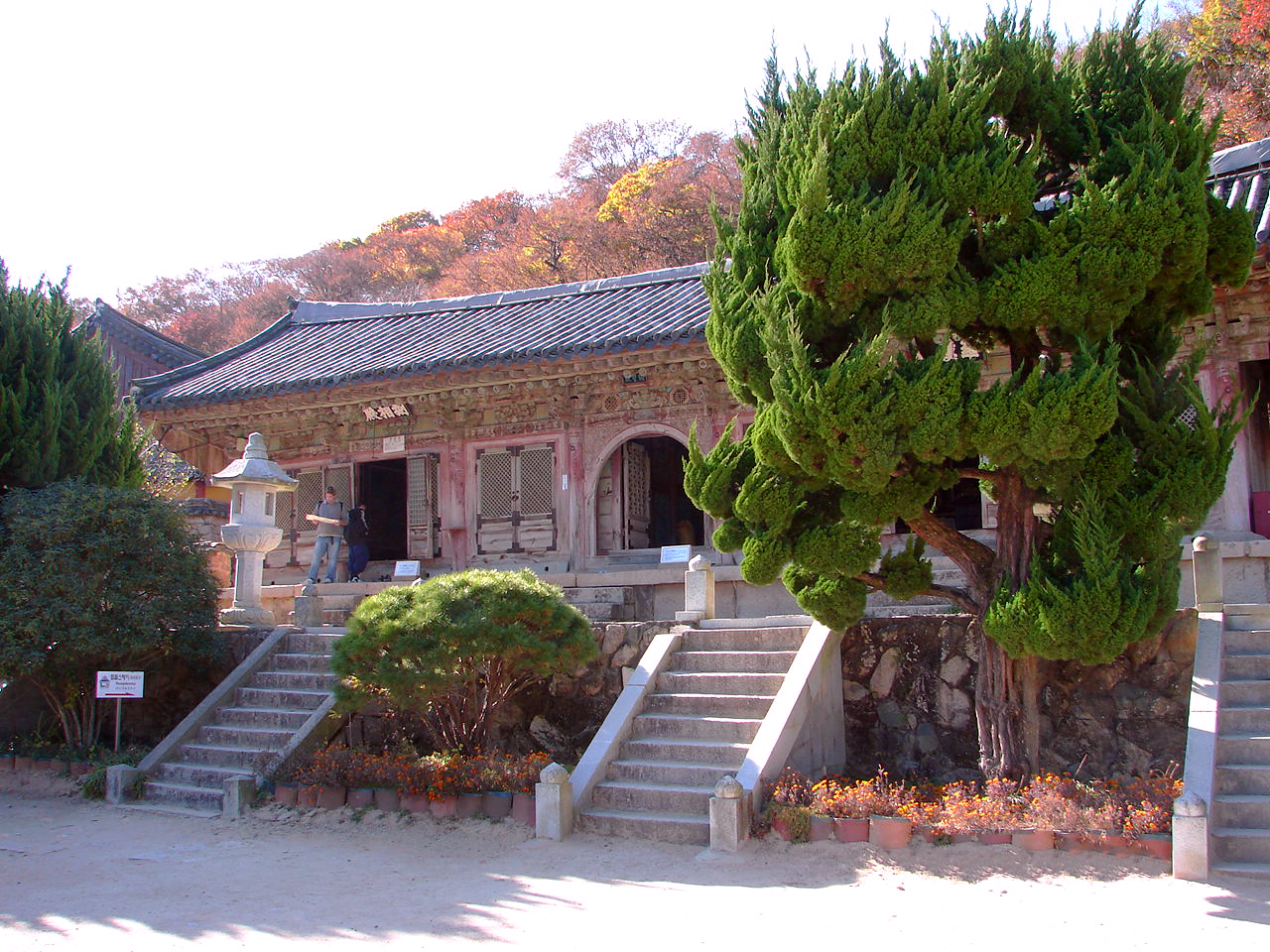
Beomeosa's Palsangjeon & Dokseongjeon

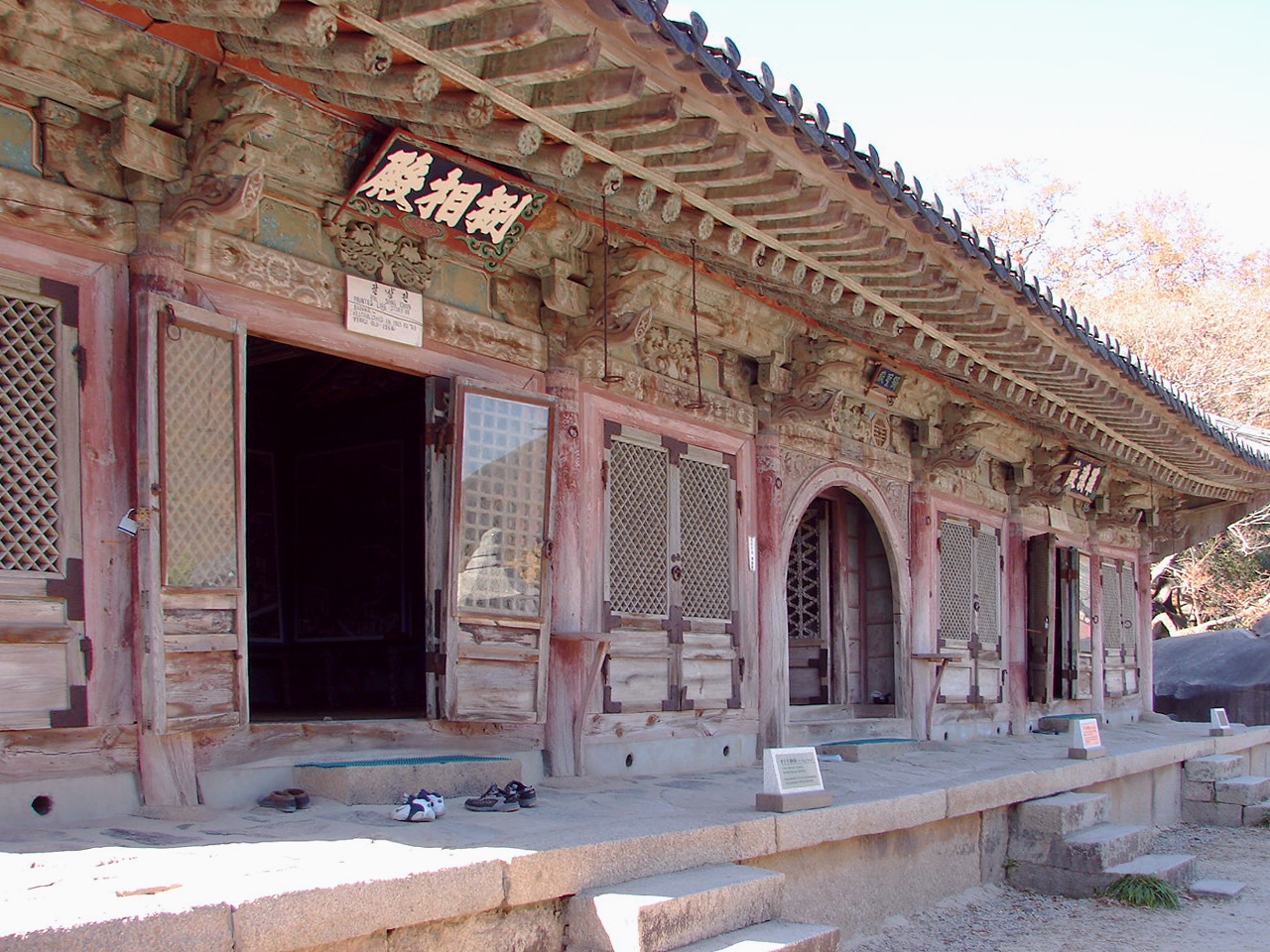
Beomeosa's Palsangjeon, Dokseongjeon & Nahanjeon

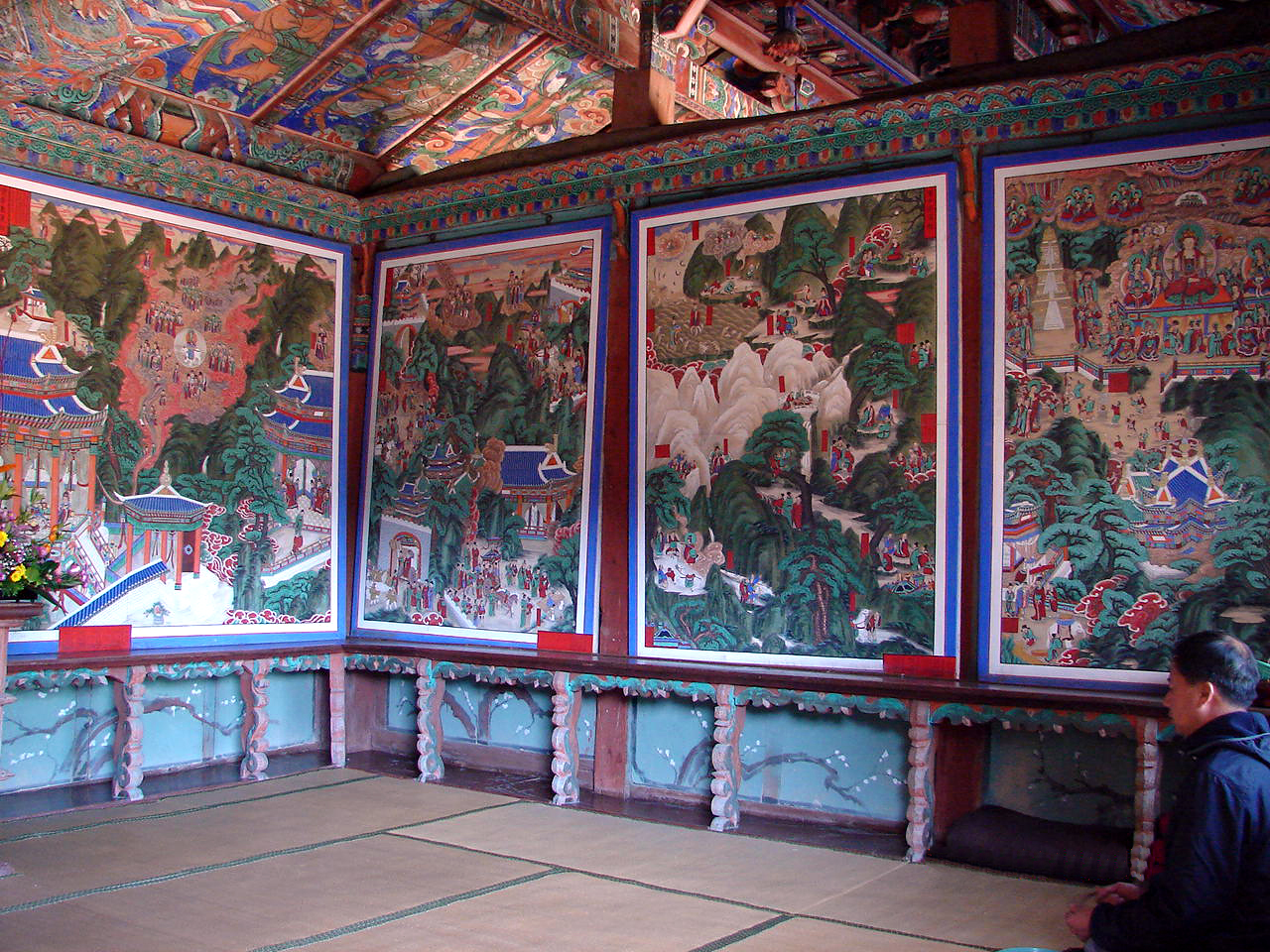
Beomeosa's Palsangjeon paintings

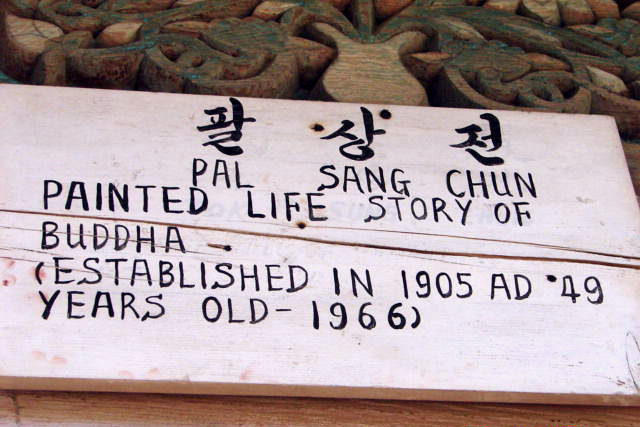
Beomeosa's Palsangjeon sign board

== See also ==
- Korean architecture
- Korean Buddhist temples
