= Songnisan =

Mountain and National Park in South Korea

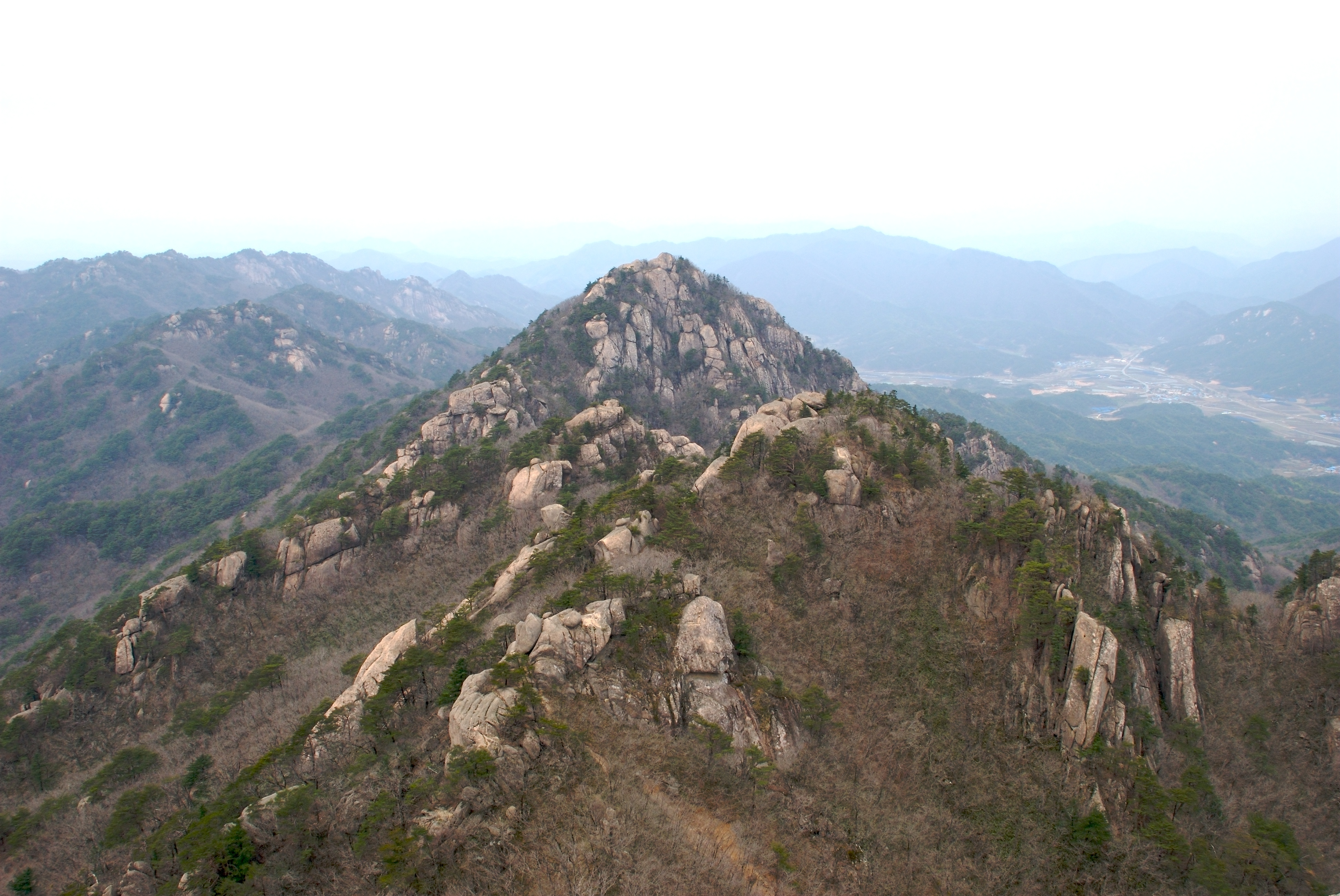

Highest point
- Elevation: 1,058.4 m (3,472 ft)
- Coordinates: 36°32′N 127°54′E

Geography
- Location: South Korea

Climbing
- Easiest route: Hike

Korean name
- Hangul: 속리산
- Hanja: 俗離山
- RR: Songnisan
- MR: Songnisan

Songnisan is a mountain and National Park in South Korea. It lies in the Sobaek Mountains along the border between the North Gyeongsang and North Chungcheong Provinces. Its main attractions are the temple Beopjusa and an especially picturesque peak, Munjangdae (1,029 m). The mountain's highest peak is Cheonhwangbong, at 1,058.4 m (3,472 ft).

Literally 'Mountain Removed from Worldliness,' Songnisan is where the 7th-century Buddhist Beopjusa temple is still located.

== Park information ==
The park's total area is 234.5 km2 and is divided into three areas. These are Beopjusa, Hwayang, and Hwabuk. Over 1000 species of fauna live in the park and there are at least 830 species of flora. There are a total of 9 peaks and 17 known temples.

The Beopjusa Buddhist temple is the largest temple in central Korea and home to several Korean national treasures and the world's largest bronze Buddha.

Before the entrance, and on the hillsides above the Beopjsua temple there are many sculptures of turtles. One can be seen in the river just downstream of the temple and it is made from three boulders. One boulder with carved eyes represents the head and two representing the front flippers.

== Munjangdae ==
Originally, Munjangdae (문장대; 文藏臺) was called Unjangdae (운장대; 雲藏臺) because of a big peak rises high into sky and is hidden in the cloud. One day, while King Sejo of Joseon took a rest and recuperation in Songnisan, a young nobleman appeared in his dream and said "If you climb into the sacred peak and pray there, your body will be improved." According to his words, King Sejo visited the peak and found the book describing the three moral rules to practice five human relations on the top. He read the book all day long on the spot. It was called Munjangdae after that.

== See also ==
- List of mountains in Korea
