= Beopjusa =

Buddhist temple in North Chungcheong, South Korea

- 법주사
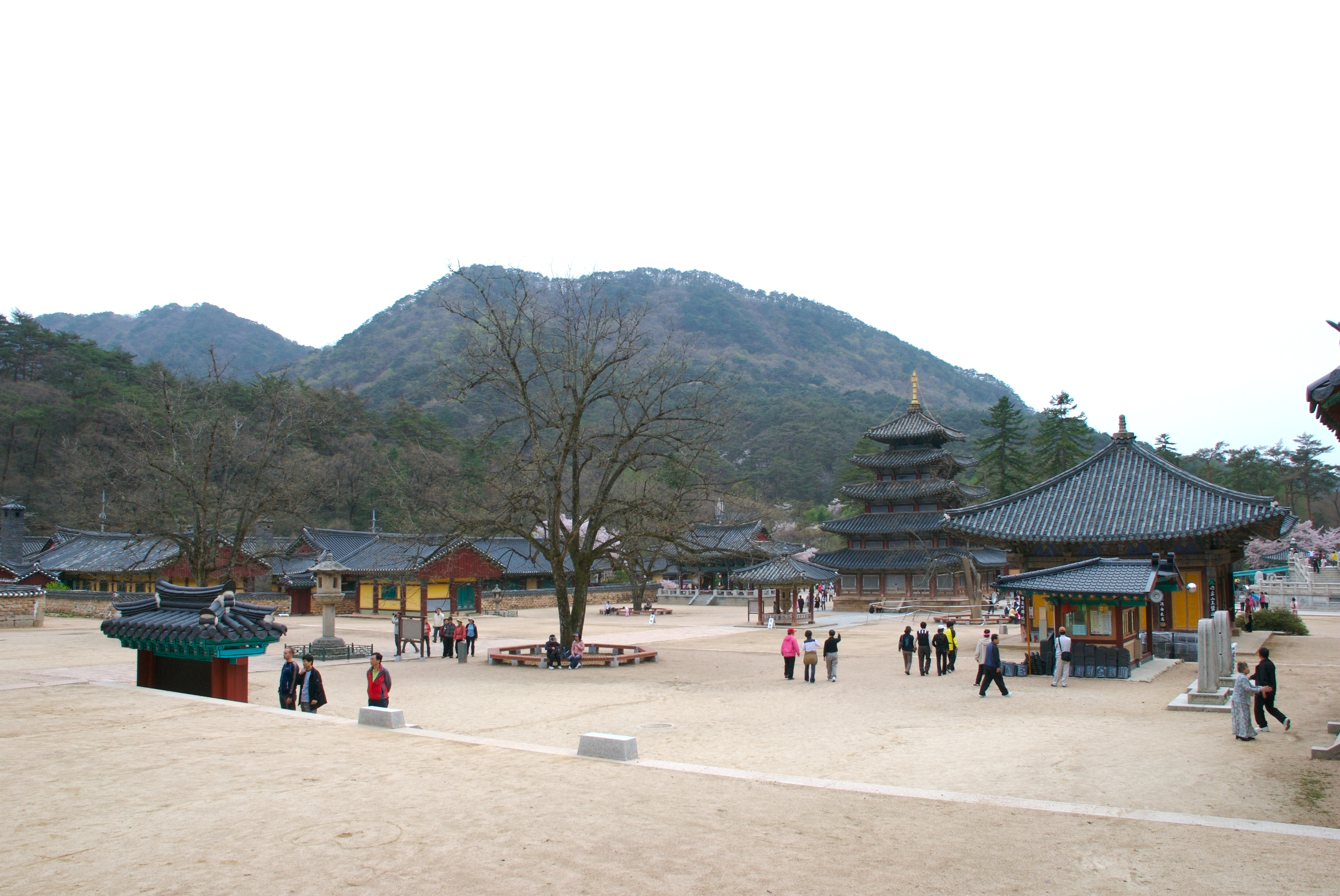
- View of Beopjusa Temple in South Korea

Religion
- Affiliation: Jogye Order of Korean Buddhism

Location
- Location: 405 Beopjusa-ro Boeun-gun North Chungcheong Province (Korean: 충청북도 보은군 속리사면 법주사로 405)
- Country: South Korea
- Interactive map of Beopjusa
- Coordinates: 36°32′32.5″N 127°50′01.5″E

UNESCO World Heritage Site
- Type: Cultural
- Criteria: (iii)
- Designated: 2018
- Part of: Sansa, Buddhist Mountain Monasteries in Korea
- Reference no.: 1562
- Region: East Asia

Historic Sites of South Korea
- Official name: Beopjusa Temple, Boeun
- Designated: 2009-12-21
- Reference no.: 503

- Beopjusa
- Hangul: 법주사
- Hanja: 法住寺
- RR: Beopjusa
- MR: Pŏpchusa

Beopjusa (Korean: 법주사; Hanja: 法住寺, lit. 'Residence of Dharma' or Beopju temple), is a head temple of the Jogye Order of Korean Buddhism. It is situated on the slopes of Songnisan, within Songnisan National Park, in Naesongni-myeon, Boeun County, in the province of North Chungcheong Province, South Korea.

It was initially constructed in 553 by Silla monk Uisin. It has been historically associated with Beopsang thought, and the worship of the Maitreya Buddha.

== History ==
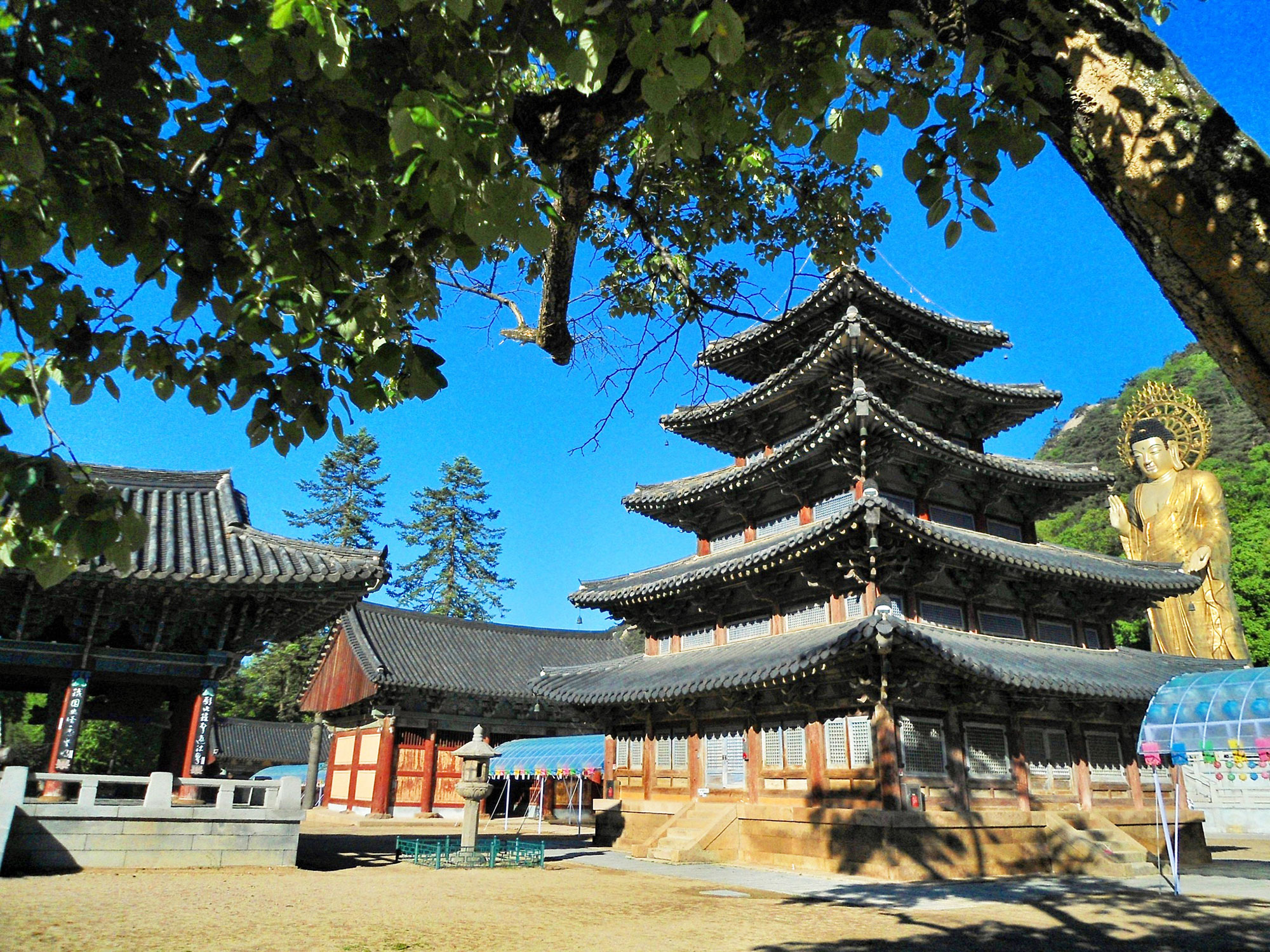
A snapshot of the temple in late spring.

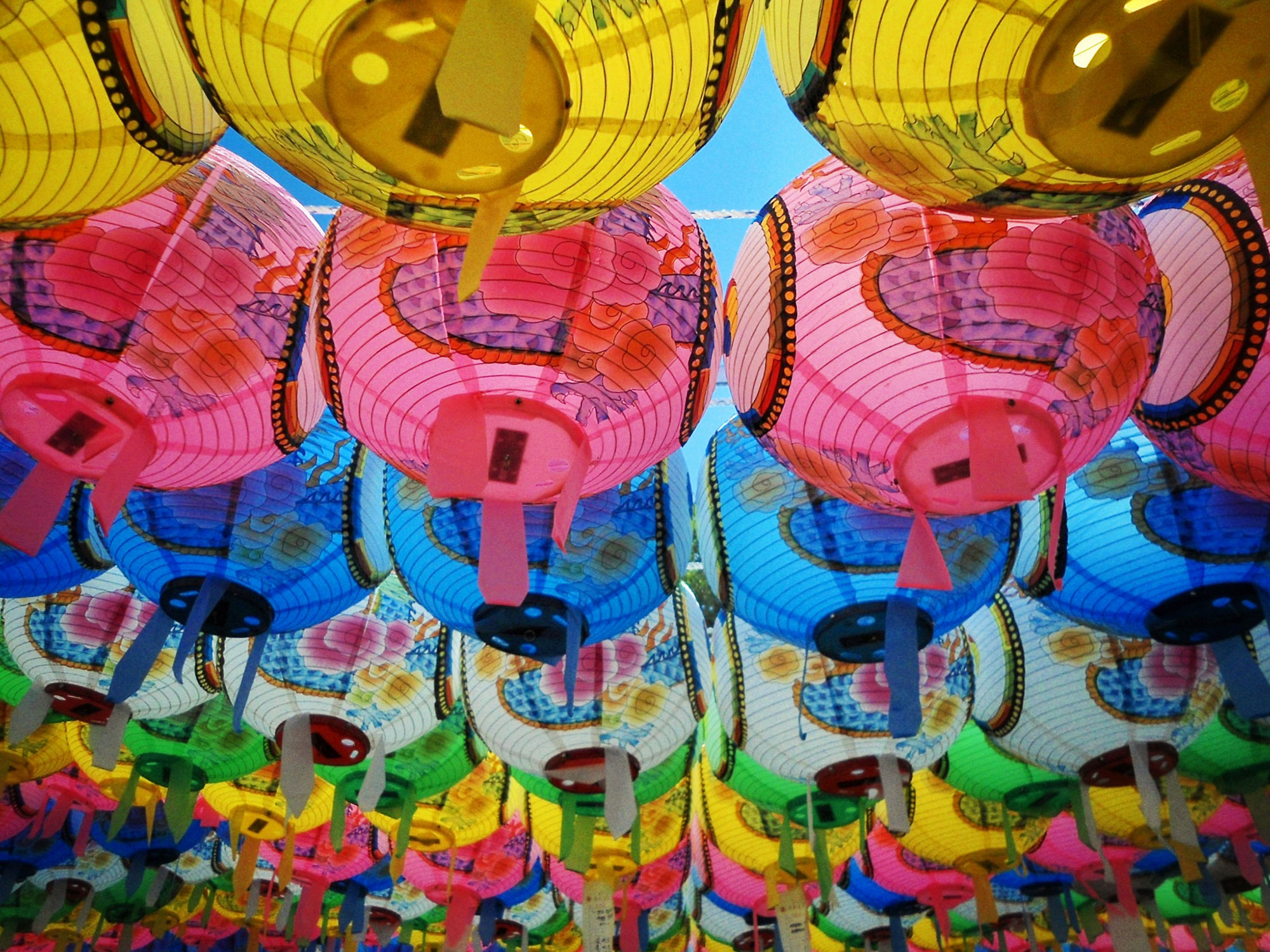
Colorful traditional lanterns found all over the Beopjusa Temple in South Korea for Buddha's birthday.

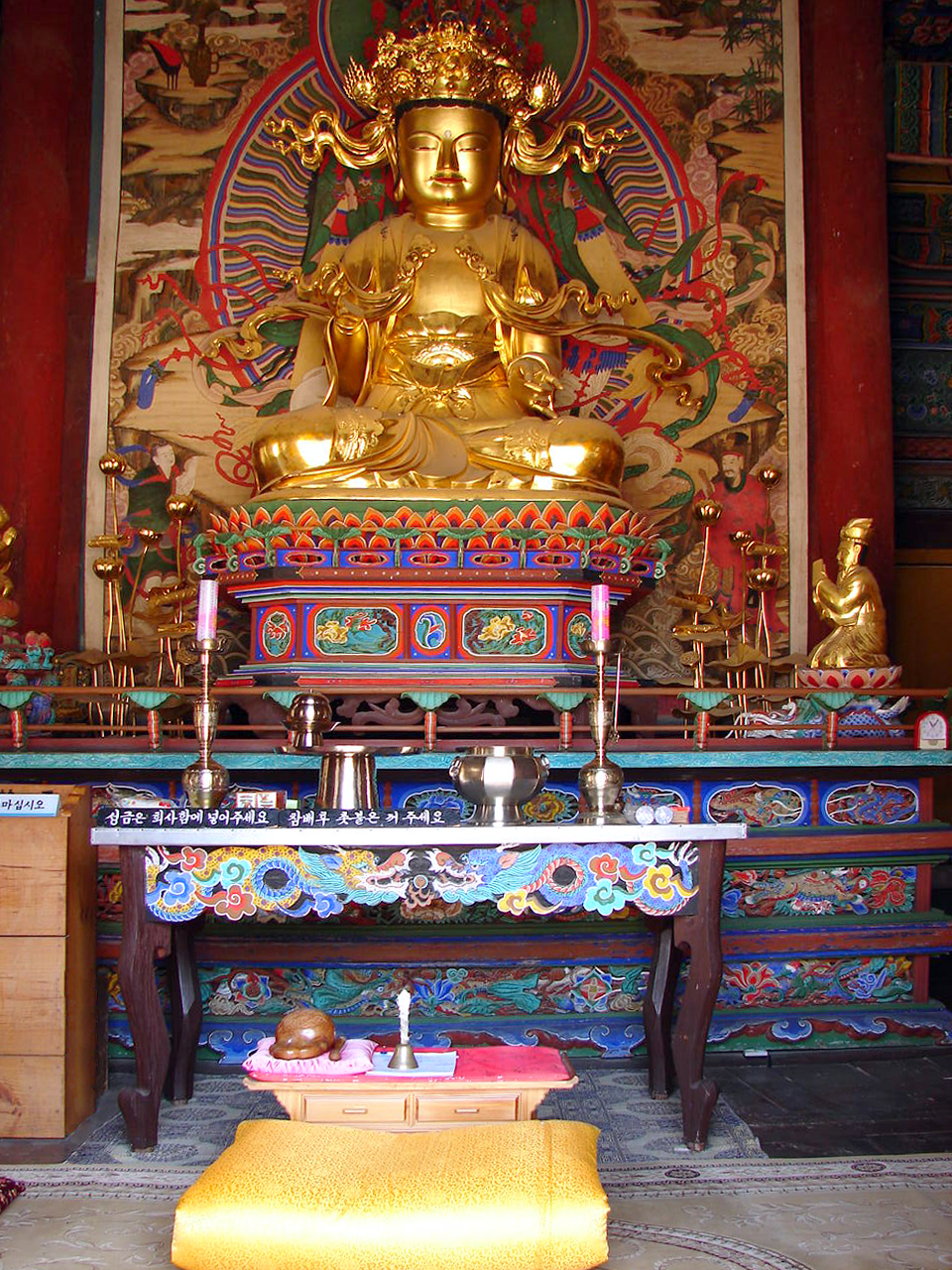
Joseon dynasty (1392-1897) statue of the Bodhisattva Gwaneum created in 1655

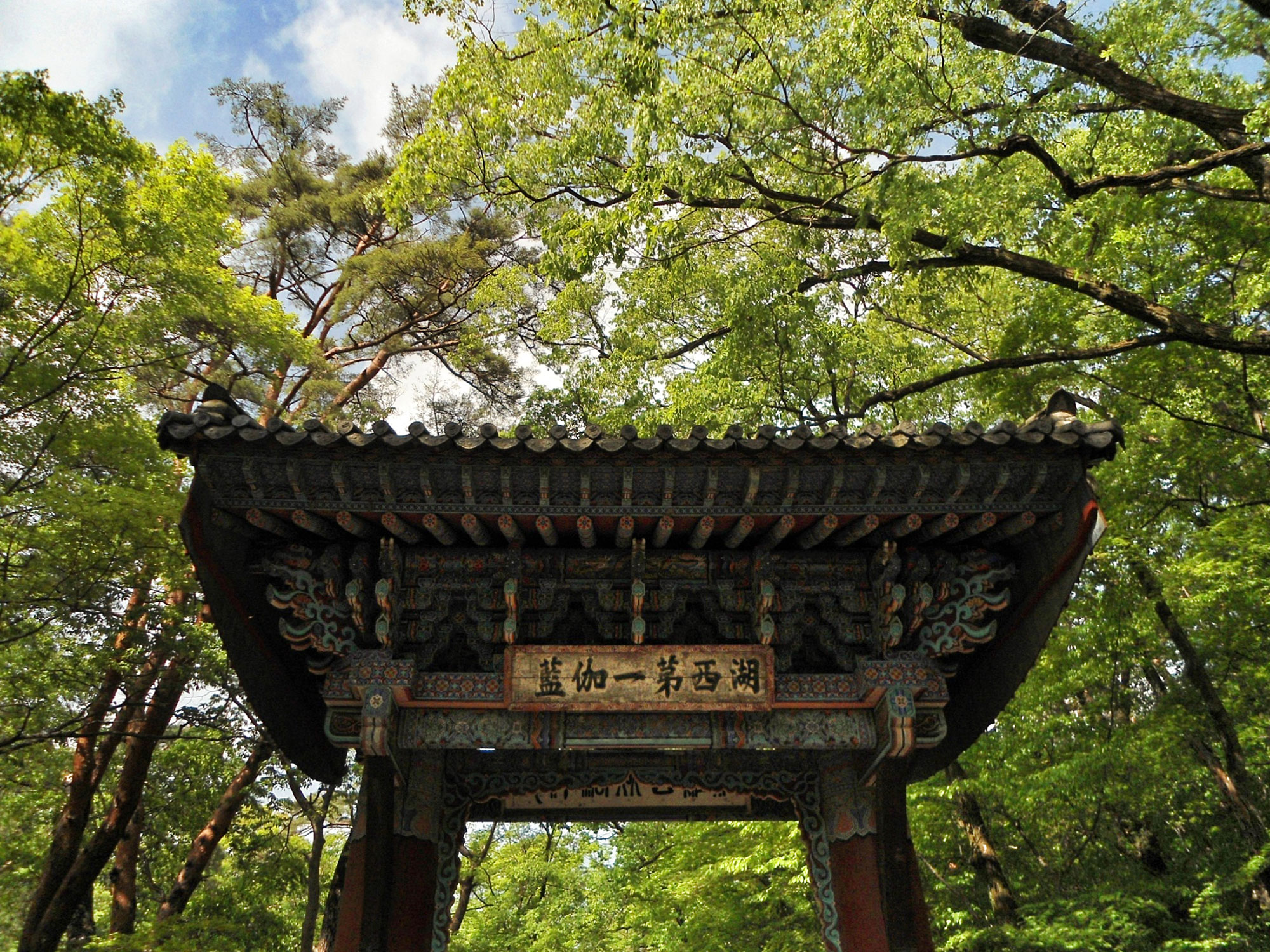
Entrance Gate to the Grounds

The founder, Uisin, named the temple Beopju (‘Residence of Dharma’) because a number of Indian sutras (scriptures about Dharma) he brought back with him were housed there. The temple includes more than 60 buildings and 70 hermitages, including the highest wooden pagoda in Korea, Palsangjeon. Like most of the other buildings, this was burned to the ground in the Japanese invasions of Korea. The pagoda was reconstructed in 1624.

In the Goryeo period, this temple is said to have been home to as many as 3,000 monks. A few facilities from this period still remain on the temple grounds, including a cistern and iron pot for serving food and water to thousands of monks.

Beopjusa continued to play an important role in subsequent centuries, but shrank as the state's support for Buddhism disappeared under the Joseon period. Joseon Dynasty founder Taejo is said to have retired to a spot near Beopjusa after tiring of his sons' fighting.

== Cultural assets ==
Beopjusa Temple owns a number of cultural heritage items: 3 national treasures; 12 miscellaneous treasures; 21 items of tangible cultural heritage of Chungcheongbukdo; and 1 item of cultural heritage material. In addition, the temple itself is designated Historic Site No. 503, the region Scenic Site No. 61, and it is also home to two natural monuments.

Among its cultural heritage possessions, one is truly unique. It is the only wooden pagoda in Korea that has preserved its original appearance, named Palsangjeon (National Treasure No. 55). Originally there were two such structures in Korea, but when the Main Buddha Hall at Ssangbongsa Temple burnt down in 1984, Palsangjeon became the only surviving wooden pagoda designated a cultural heritage. In a hall open on four sides, the Huigyeon Bosal (The Beautiful Bodhisattva, Sudarsana) (Treasure No. 1417) is enshrined. This bodhisattva stands on a foundation stone and carries an incense burner on his head to fulfill his vow to offer incense to the Buddha for eternity.

The Folding Screen of Celestial Charts (Treasure No. 848) is a cultural heritage not directly related to Buddhism. Featuring 300 constellations consisting of 3,083 stars, the Charts were created by Kim Tae-seo and An Guk-bin, two scholars from the Meteorological Administration. They are based on charts their teacher, I. Koegler, made in 1723 during his stay in China. Of all the celestial charts made by Koegler, this one is the largest and most accurate, thus giving it international value as well. It is thought that these charts were given to Beopjusa Temple by King Yeongjo when the Wondang (Prayer Shrine) for the king's deceased Royal Concubine Yeongbin of the Yi Clan was established here.

Another unusual heritage is the stele of Ven. Jajeong Gukjon (慈淨國尊: 1240–1327) (Tangible Cultural Heritage of Chungcheongbukdo No. 79). A memorial to this monk who had risen to the rank of National Preceptor was inscribed on the natural stone cliff by royal decree of King Chunghye. Seonhuigung Wondang, a structure located behind the Main Buddha Hall, is the prayer shrine for Yeongbin of the Yi Clan, the mother of Crown Prince Sado and a royal concubine of King Yeongjo. Having the same name as her shrine in the Chilgung Shrine Complex (where ancestral tablets of seven royal concubines are kept), it is unusual a prayer shrine for a royal concubine be located in a temple.

Another cultural heritage relic to see is the Stone Pot, Tangible Cultural Heritage of Chungcheongbuk-do No. 204. A stone sculpture in the shape of an earthen pot, it is partially buried in the ground at a site 40 meters (131 feet) left of Chongji Seon Center. Cultural heritage experts have no idea about its purpose, but legend says it was used to store kimchi.

== In popular culture ==
Beopjusa was chosen by Bruce Lee as the original setting for the movie Game of Death, with the five floors of Palsangjeon pagoda representing five different martial arts. Since Bruce Lee died before the movie was completed, the screenplay was changed, and Beopjusa was edited out.

== Gallery ==
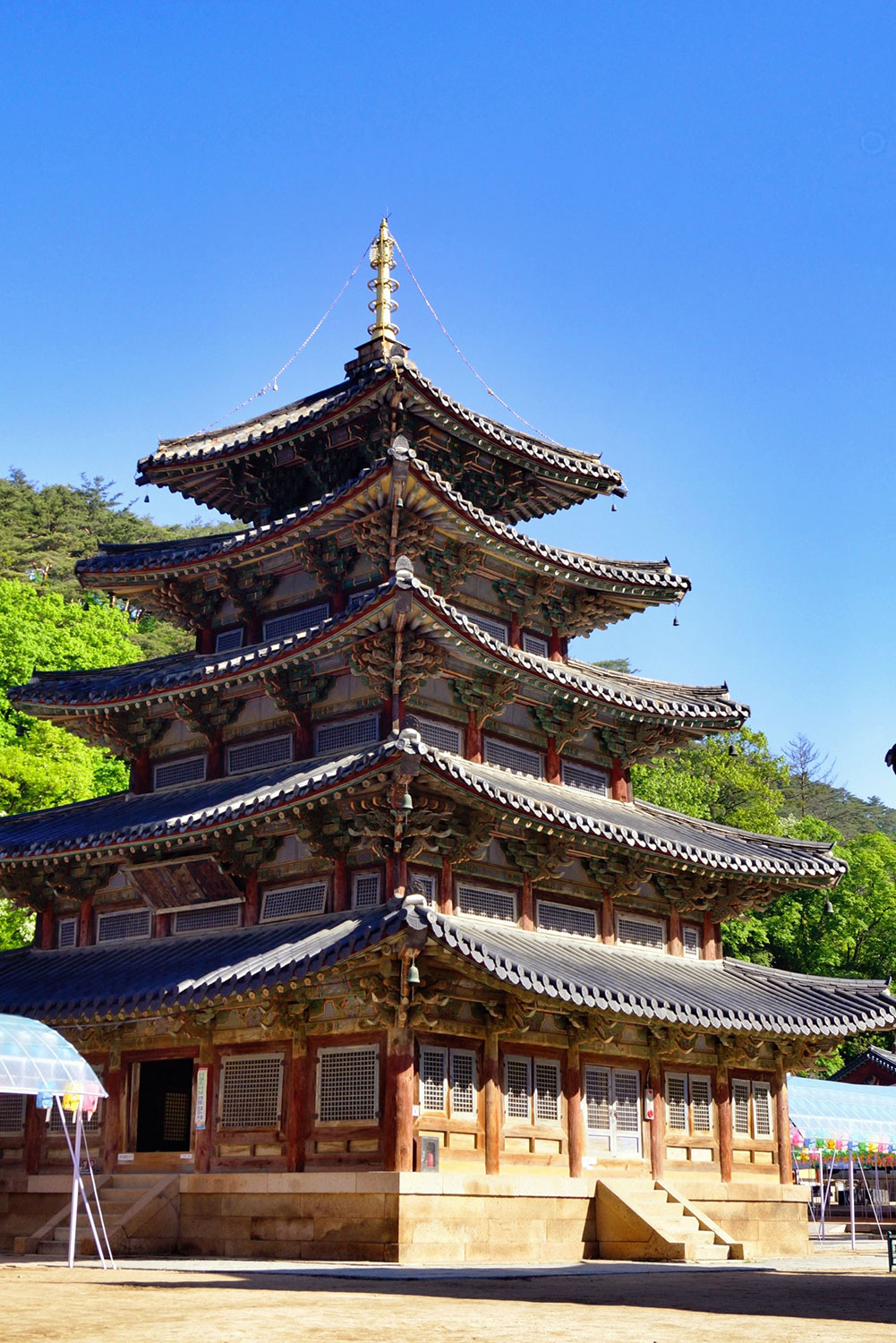
Palsangjeon is believed to be the oldest and tallest pagoda found in Korea. It is one of only 2 wooden pagodas in the country.

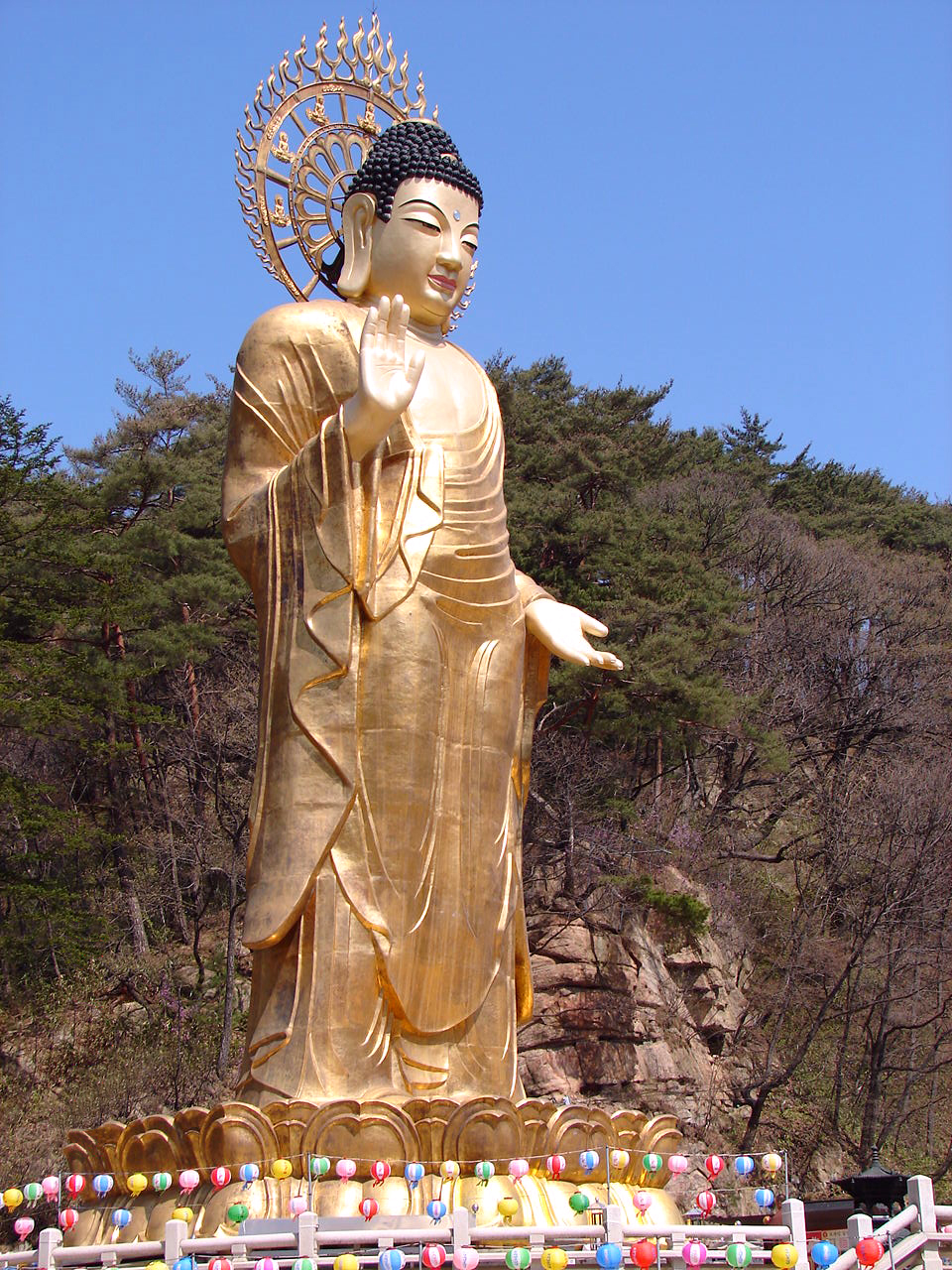
Golden Maitreya Statue of National Unification at Beopjusa

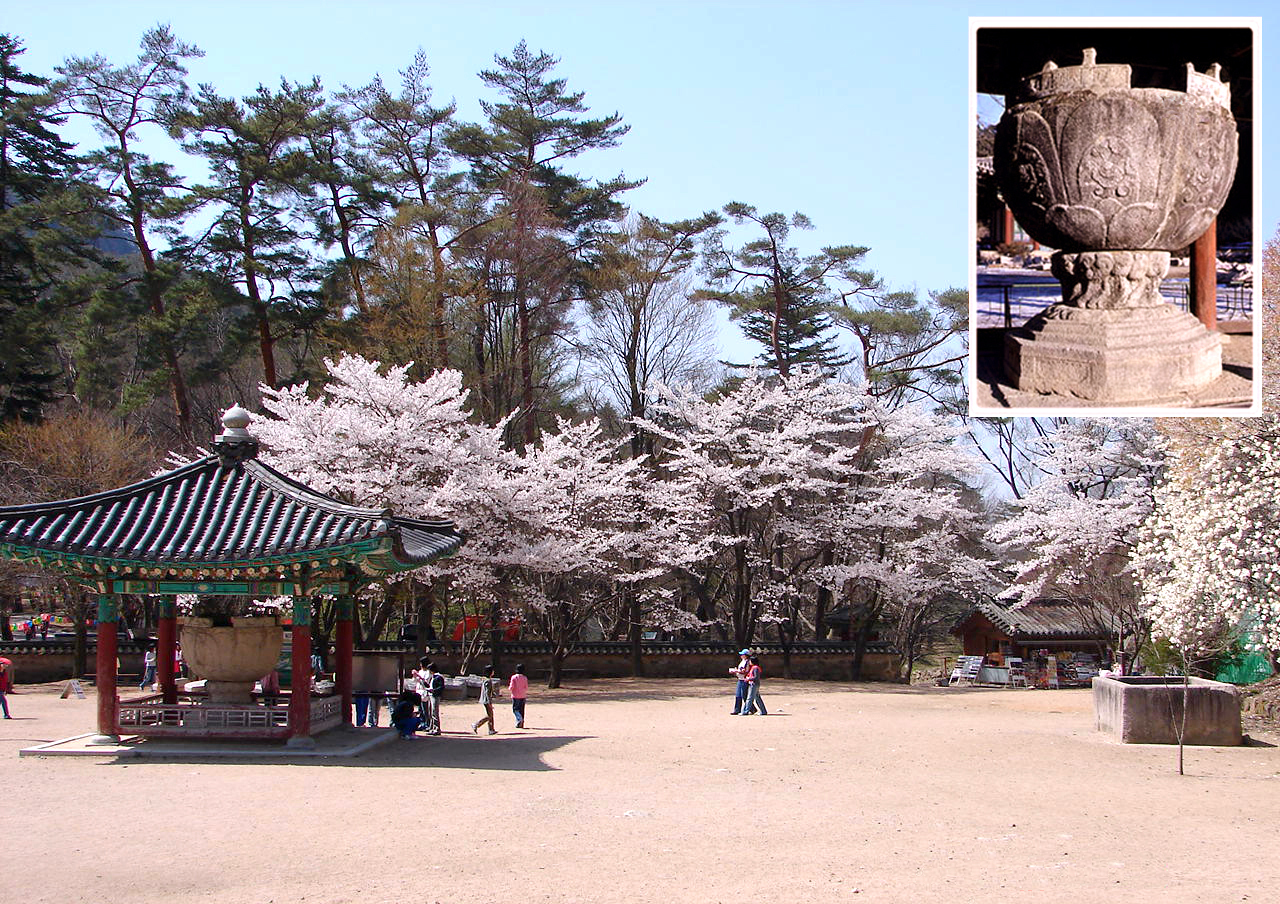
Beopjusa Seogyeonji (stone basin) is National Treasure #64.

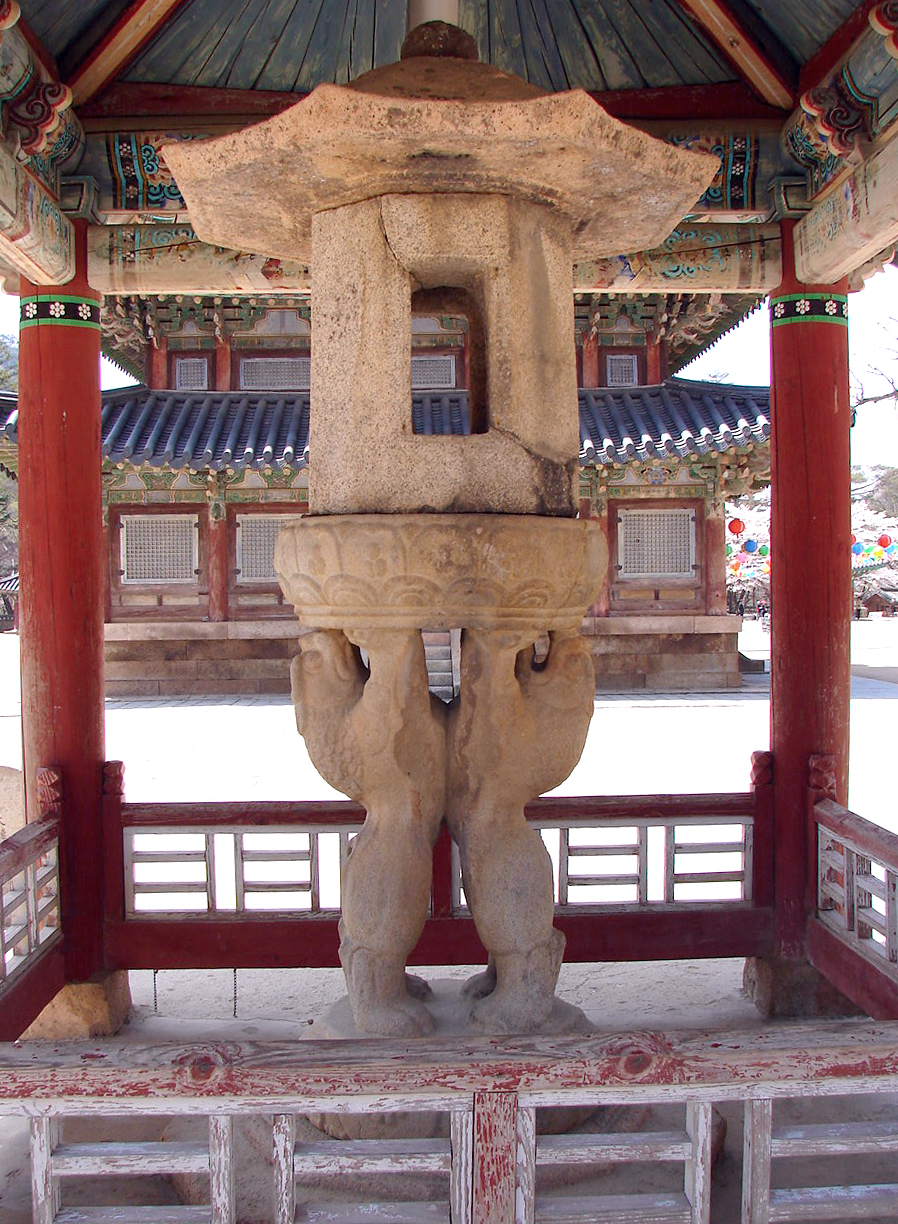
Ssangsajaseokdeung (Two Lion Stone Lamp) is National Treasure #5.

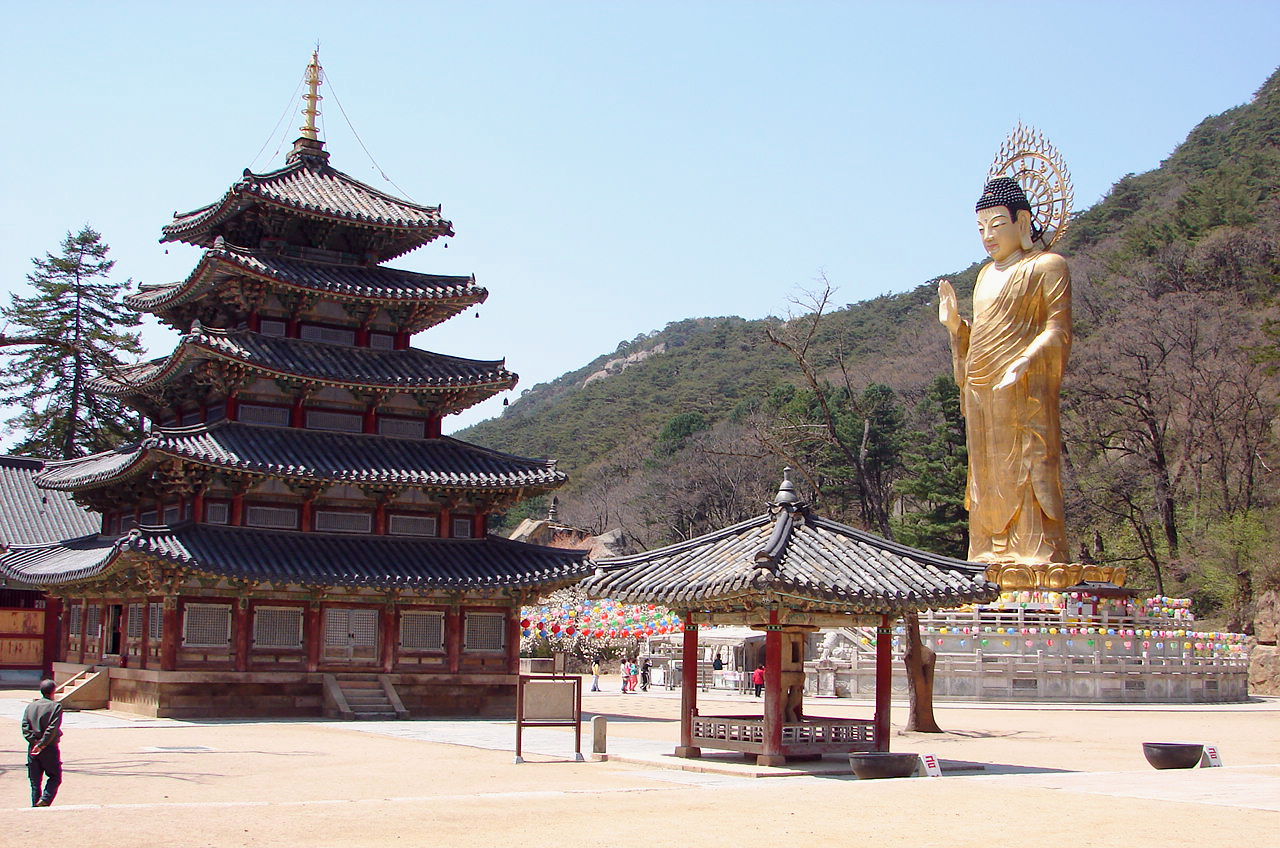
Palsangjeon (Hall of Eight Pictures) is located at Beopjusa is National Treasure of Korea #55.

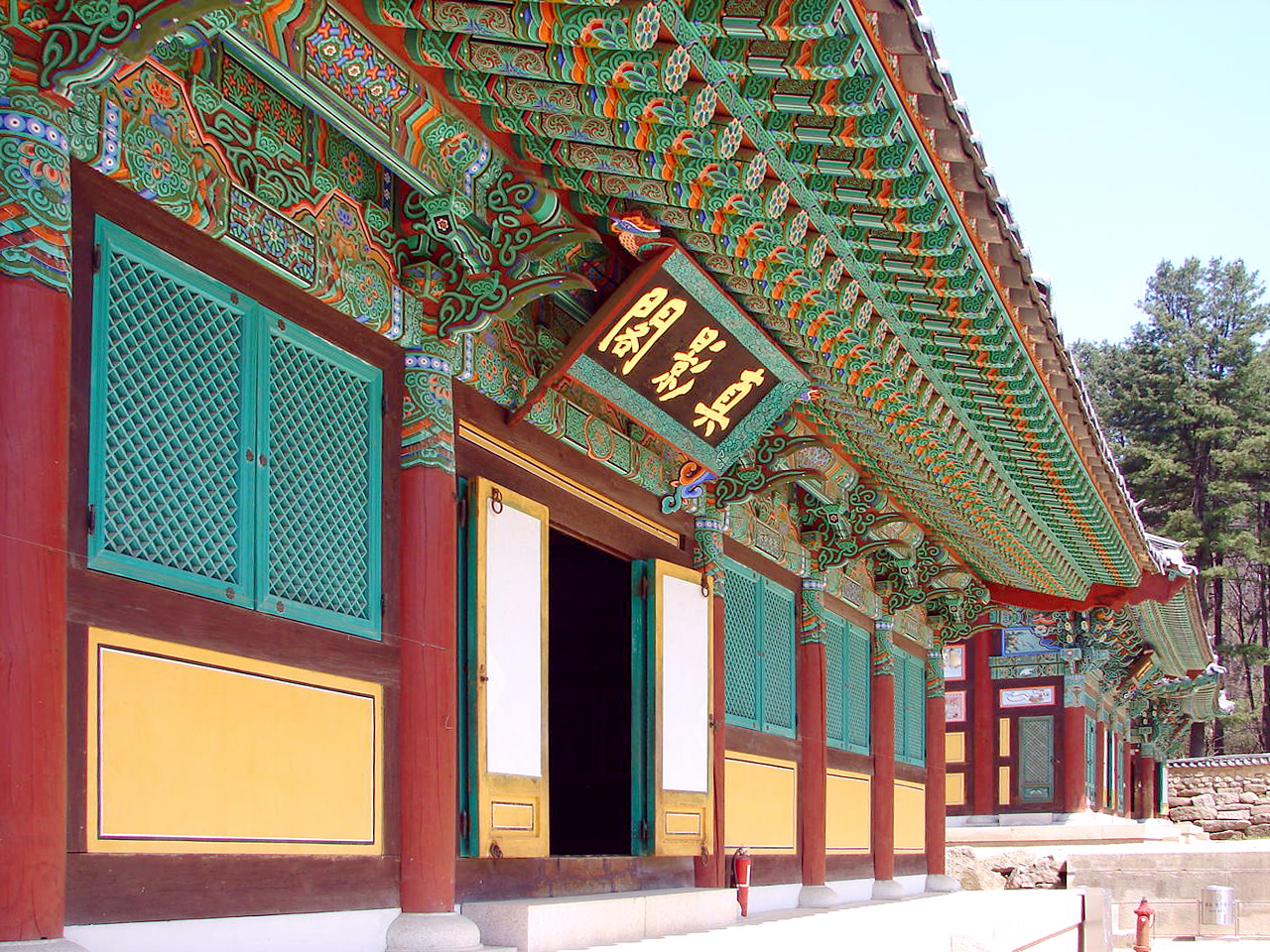

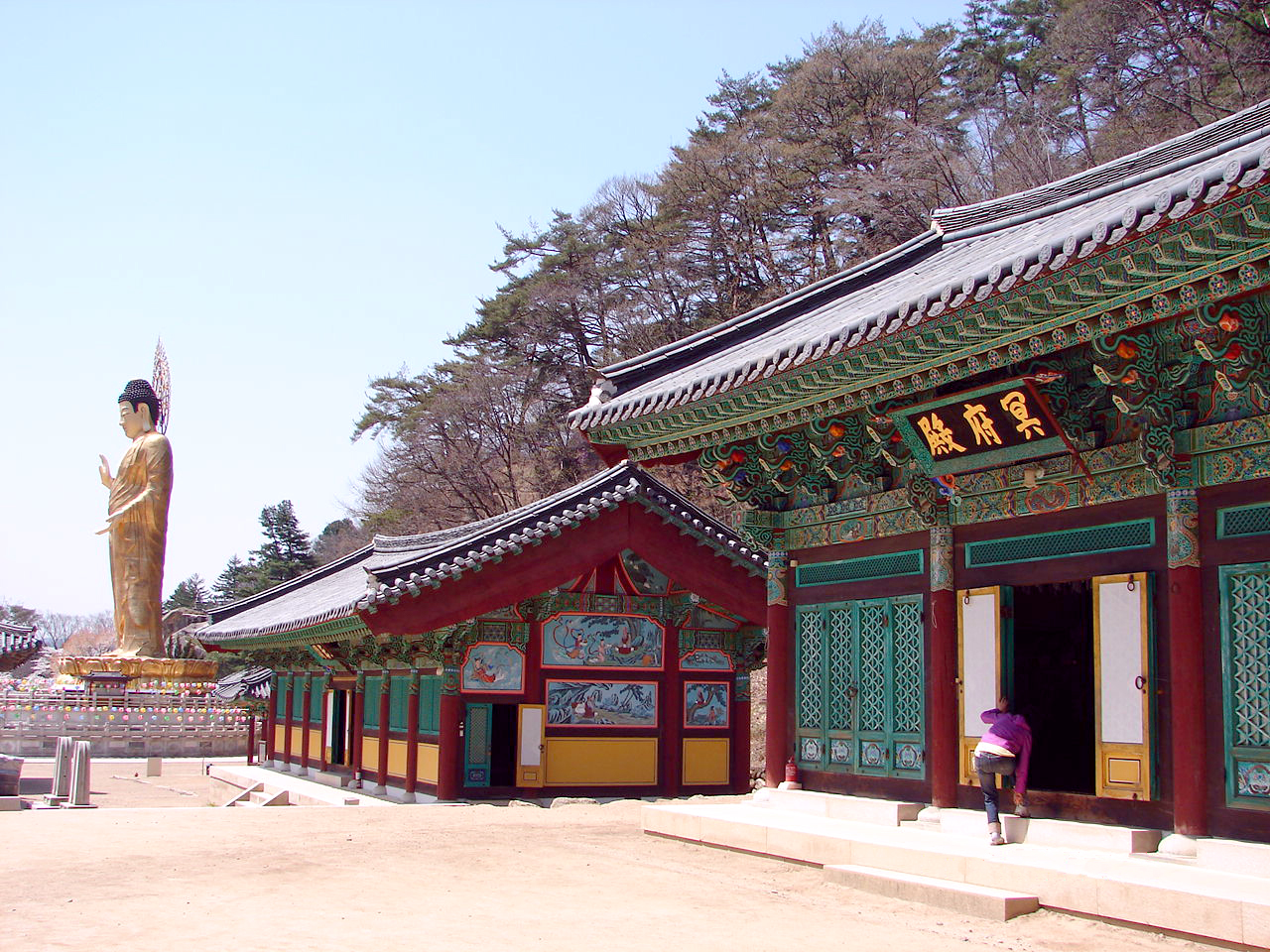

== Tourism ==
Beopjusa also offers temple stay programs where visitors can experience Buddhist culture.

== See also ==
- Palsangjeon
- Korean Buddhist temples
- Korean Buddhism
- Korean architecture
