= Dancheong =

Korean traditional decorative coloring

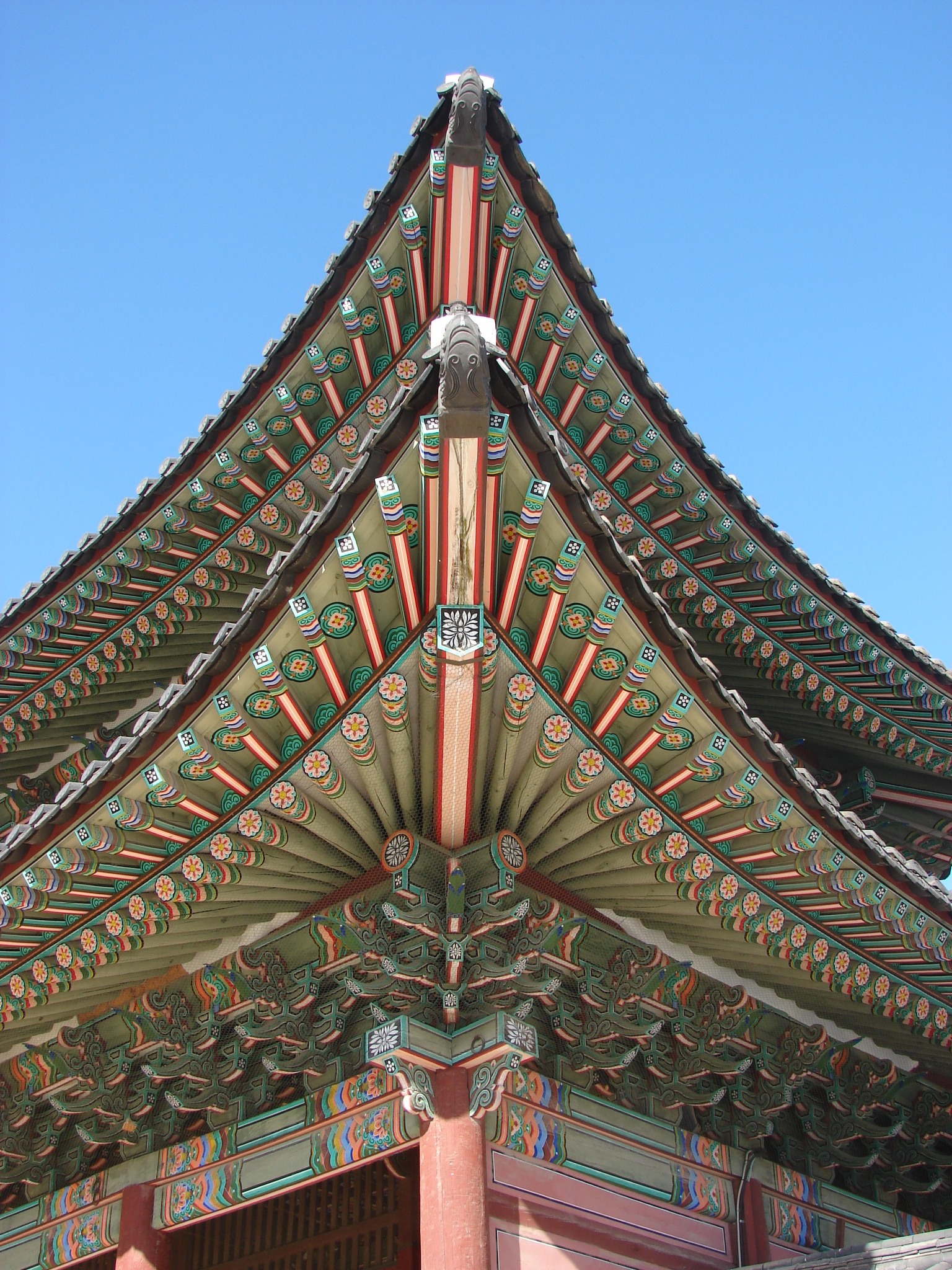
- A dancheong in Seoul

Korean name
- Hangul: 단청
- Hanja: 丹靑
- RR: dancheong
- MR: tanch'ŏng

Dancheong (Korean: 단청; Hanja: 丹靑) refers to Korean decorative colouring on wooden buildings and artifacts for the purpose of style. It is an adaptation of the Chinese practice danqing, danqing refers to Chinese painting on silk and paper, and also decoration on wood. It literally means "cinnabar and blue-green", and is sometimes translated as "red and blue" in English. Along with its decorations and the choice of paint colours, Dancheong carries various symbolic meanings. It is based on five basic colours; blue (east), white (west), red (south), black (north), and yellow (center). Together, these colours symbolize the desire for stability, peace, and a rewarding afterlife. Furthermore, the use of those five colours reflected the use of the yin and yang principle and the philosophy of the five elements.

The Dancheong is usually used in important places, such as temples and palaces, and can even be found on the eaves of temple's roofs with patterns of animals (e.g. dragons, lions, cranes). Dancheong also functions not only as decoration, but also for practical purposes such as to protect building surfaces against temperature and to make the crudeness of materials less conspicuous. It also protects the wood against insects, prolonging its lifetime. Applying dancheong on the surfaces of buildings require trained skills, and artisans called dancheongjang (단청장 丹青匠) designed the painted patterns. The Dancheonjang are considered living national treasures in South Korea and are classified as being part of the National Intangible Cultural Heritage by the Cultural Heritage Administration in South Korea.

== History ==
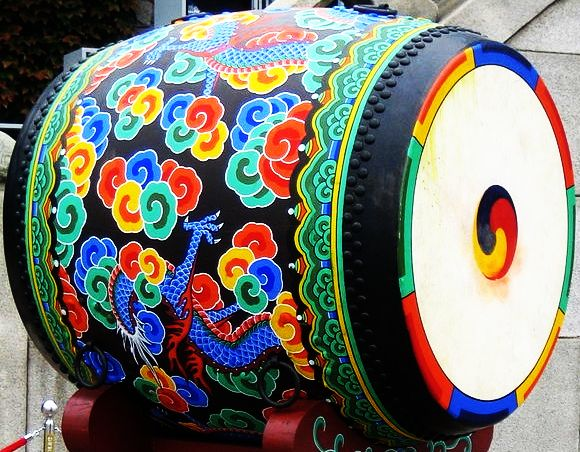

丹青 (Danqing/Dancheong) was documented in the Rites of Zhou (周礼·秋官司寇), a Chinese text written between 300 BC and 200 BC.

The origin of the word danqing comes from the combination of the Chinese characters dan (丹) and qing (青). Dan (丹) refers to dansha(丹砂, lit. cinnabar), a red or vermillion mineral pigment, and qing (青) refers to qingyu (青雘), a cyan or blue-green mineral pigment. Because ancient Chinese paintings often used these two colors, danqing became a synonym for painting in the Chinese language. Throughout its history, danqing has taken on multiple meanings, and may refer to:

1. The minerals dansha (丹砂; cinnabar) and qingyu (青雘; azurite);
2. colorful mineral and metal pigments in general;
3. the colors vermillion and cyan;
4. colors or all vibrant colors in general;
5. a specific Chinese painting, and/or Chinese paintings and patterns (on silk, paper, architectures and other things) in general;
6. the art or process of Chinese painting;
7. painter(s)/Chinese painter(s), artists who mastered the art of Chinese painting;
8. historical records

Since the Three Kingdoms era, the Korean Dancheong patterns have developed its own distinctive Korean characteristics, from tomb murals into wooden architecture. The earliest example of Dancheong was found on a mural in an ancient tomb built in 357 AD during Goguryeo. The Dancheong can also be seen today in the Goguryeo Tomb Complexes, Tomb of the General, and other Goguryeo structures across North Korea and Northeastern China. In Silla, the Dancheong was even used on commoner's homes. The Dancheong has also been recorded in ancient documents, such as the Samguk sagi and the Samguk yusa. The use of Buddhism as national religion contributed to the development of Dancheong.

In the 12th century a document titled Goryeo Do-Kyung (高麗圖經) which literally means "Illustrated Account of Goryeo" (918-1392), the Chinese author Xu Jing described the luxurious dancheong on the places at that time. Goryeo Do-Kyung illustrates the dancheong in detail that the handrail was painted in red and decorated with vine-flowers. The colouring and patterns were very vivid, so that the palace stood out among other royal palaces. There are several examples of the dancheong from the Goryeo period such as Josadang (조사당) of Buseoksa Temple in Yeongju, Geukrakjeon (극락전) at Bongjeongsa Temple in Andong, and Daeungjeon (대웅전) of Sudeoksa Temple in Yesan.

Since the Joseon dynasty, the Dancheong was greatly developed and began to diversify further, featuring various patterns and the use of more profuse colours. The Joseon era dancheon usually uses green as the basic background while elaborate patterns of contrasting colour are then painted over it. Those patterns are inspired by plants, especially the lotus flower, which directly connect the Dancheong to Buddhism.

== Types ==
The system of patterns is categorized into four different types based on the structural characteristics and positions within the decorative composition. The four types include:

- Morucho
- Byeoljihwa
- Bidan munui
- Dandong munui

Morucho pattern is mainly painted on the ends of the building’s upper supporting beams and upper corners like eaves, and it commonly incorporates natural forms such as water lily, pomegranate, and feather. Byeoljihwa is painted between two sections of morucho patterns. Often depicted in byeoljihwa are various auspicious animals or scenes from Buddhist sutras and it was mostly used in temples but not in palace buildings. Bidan munui (silk pattern) is the colorful geometric patterns that can be found throughout the building, and dandok munui (single/independent pattern) refers to pattern designs that are based on a single plant or animal.

== Restoration process ==
As part of the restoration process, the paint colours used in Dancheong need to be carefully prepared, and the entire process is supervised by the Cultural Heritage Administration with written documents. The process of the restoration methods include: (1) inspection of the building's current state and its environment; (2) discussion surrounding the restoration method needed takes place; (3) rough sketches of the remaining dancheong patterns and colour pigment are selected. The final decision concerning what is the best repairing method to be used for restoration purposes is made through professional advisory processes continually throughout the entire process.

The two main types of painting techniques are: (1) Gosae-dancheong (i.e. painting the entire building) and (2) Gosaegttam-dancheong (only paints the recently damaged parts).

== Gallery ==
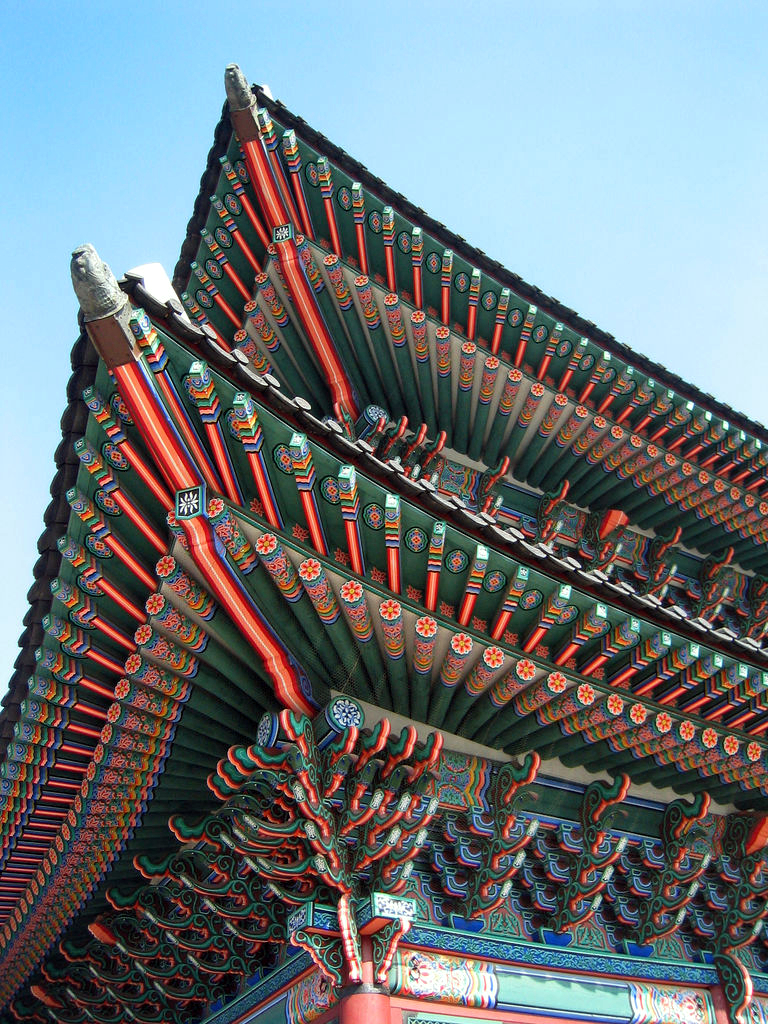
Dancheong on a building at Gyeongbokgung

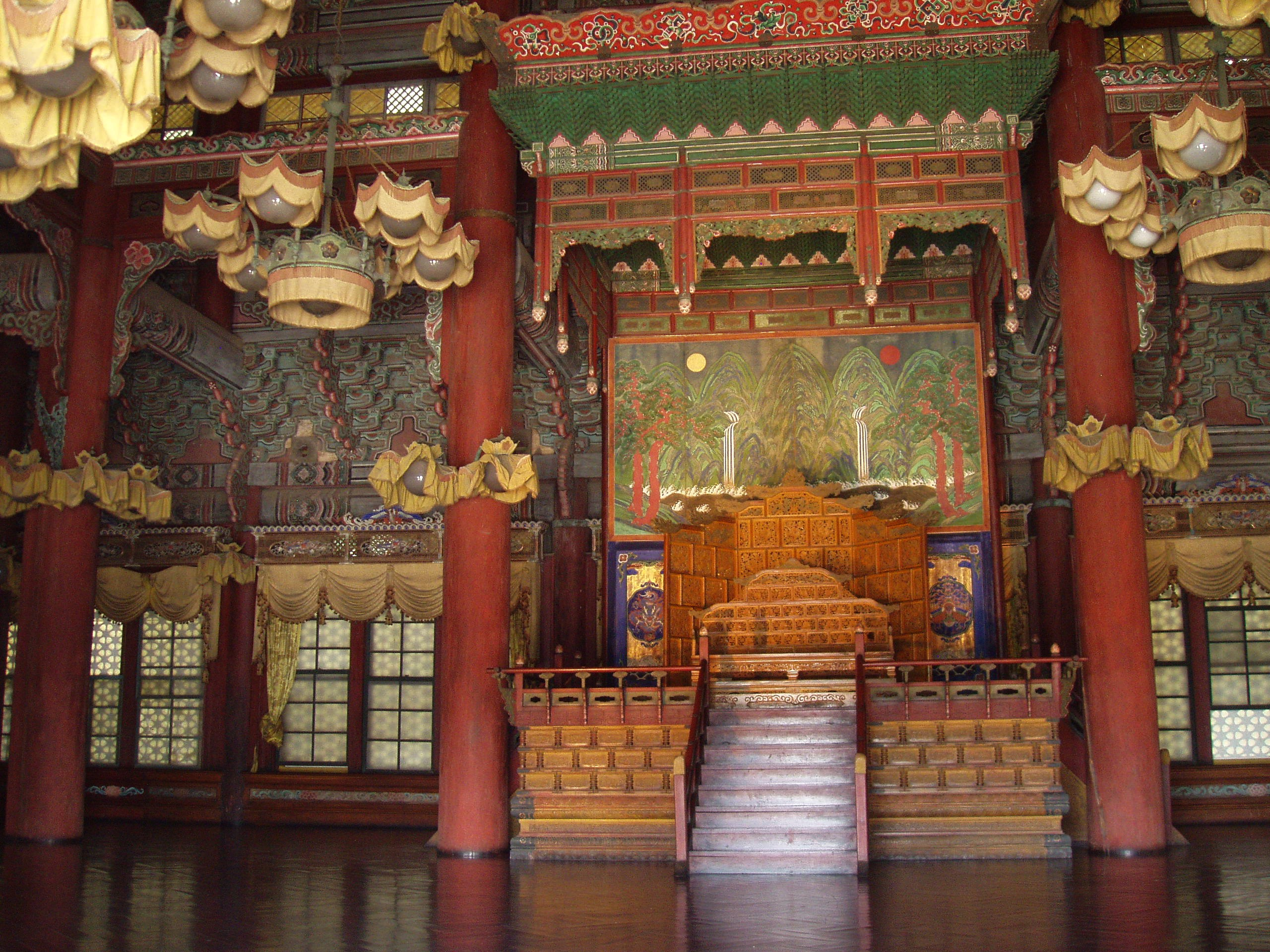
The interior of Injeongjeon, Changdeokgung

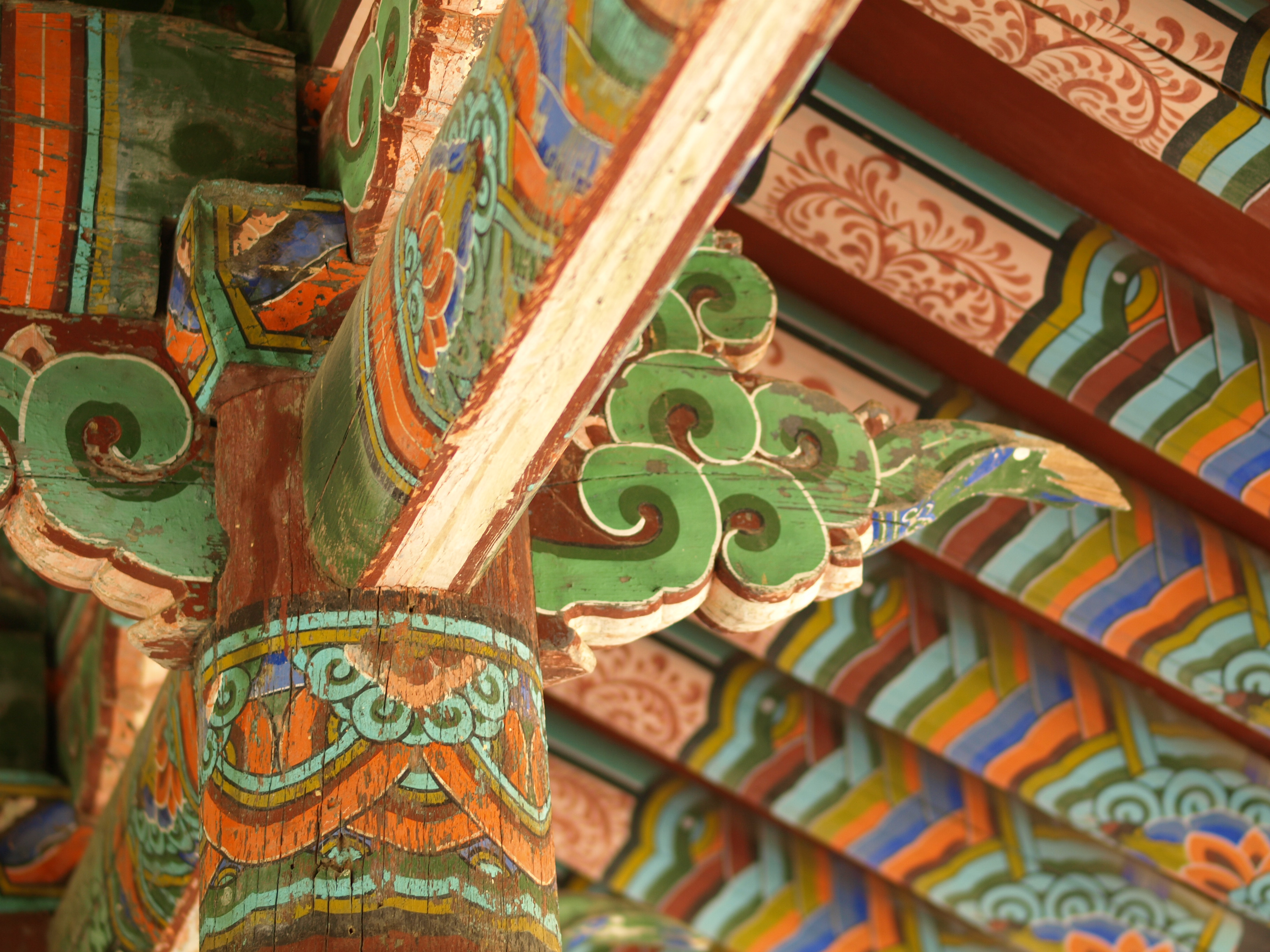
Cheongpeongsa Temple in Chuncheon

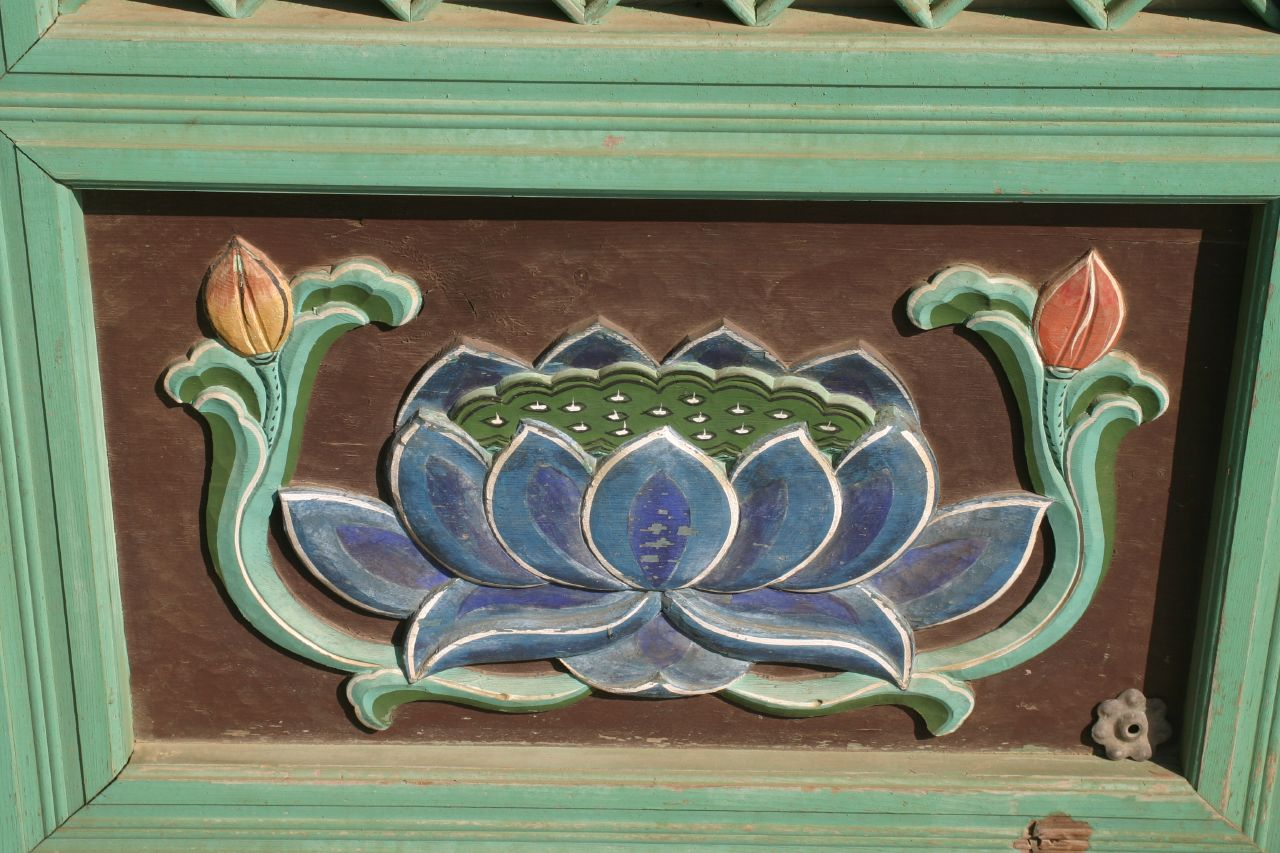
Lotus pattern

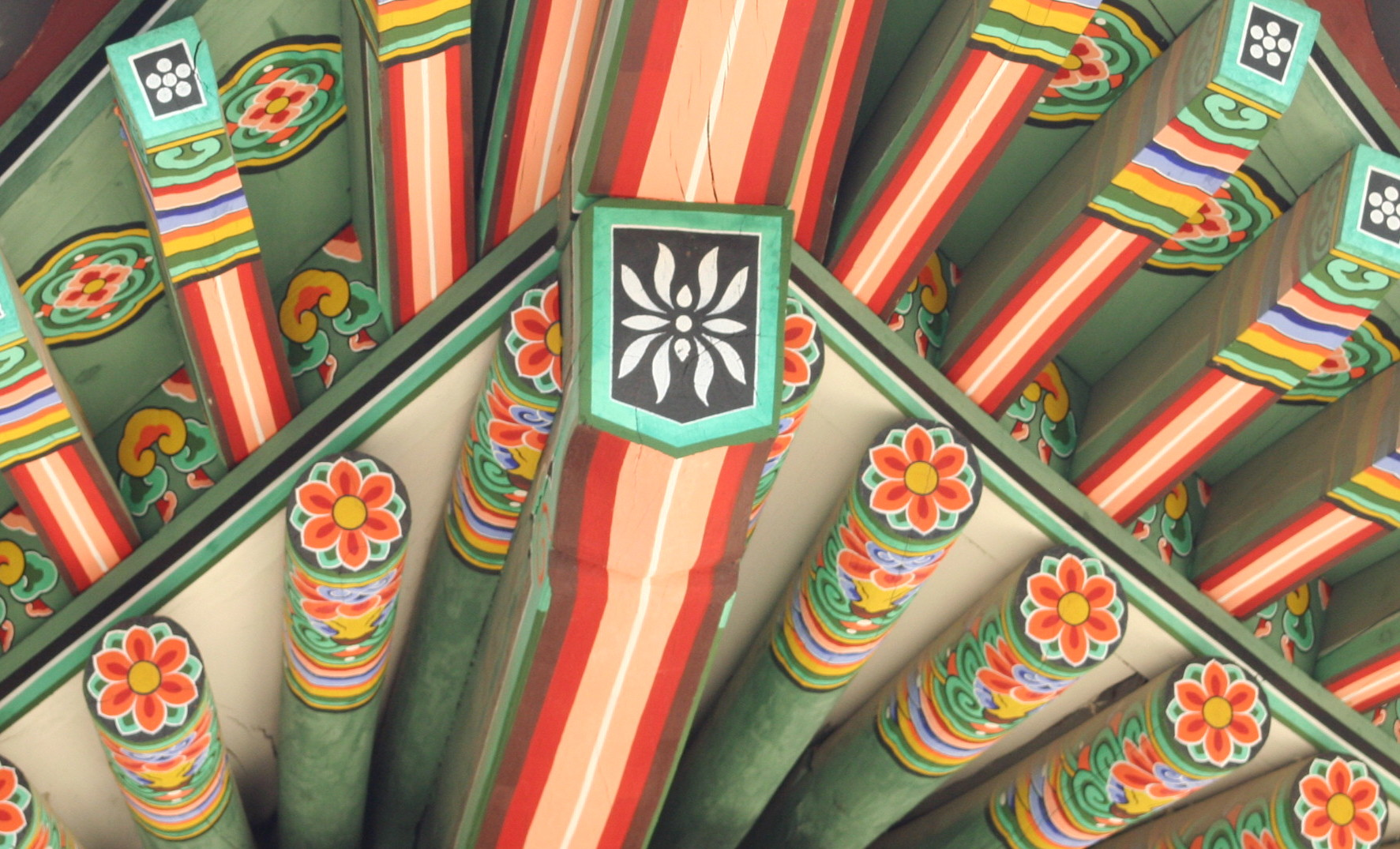
Changdeokgung

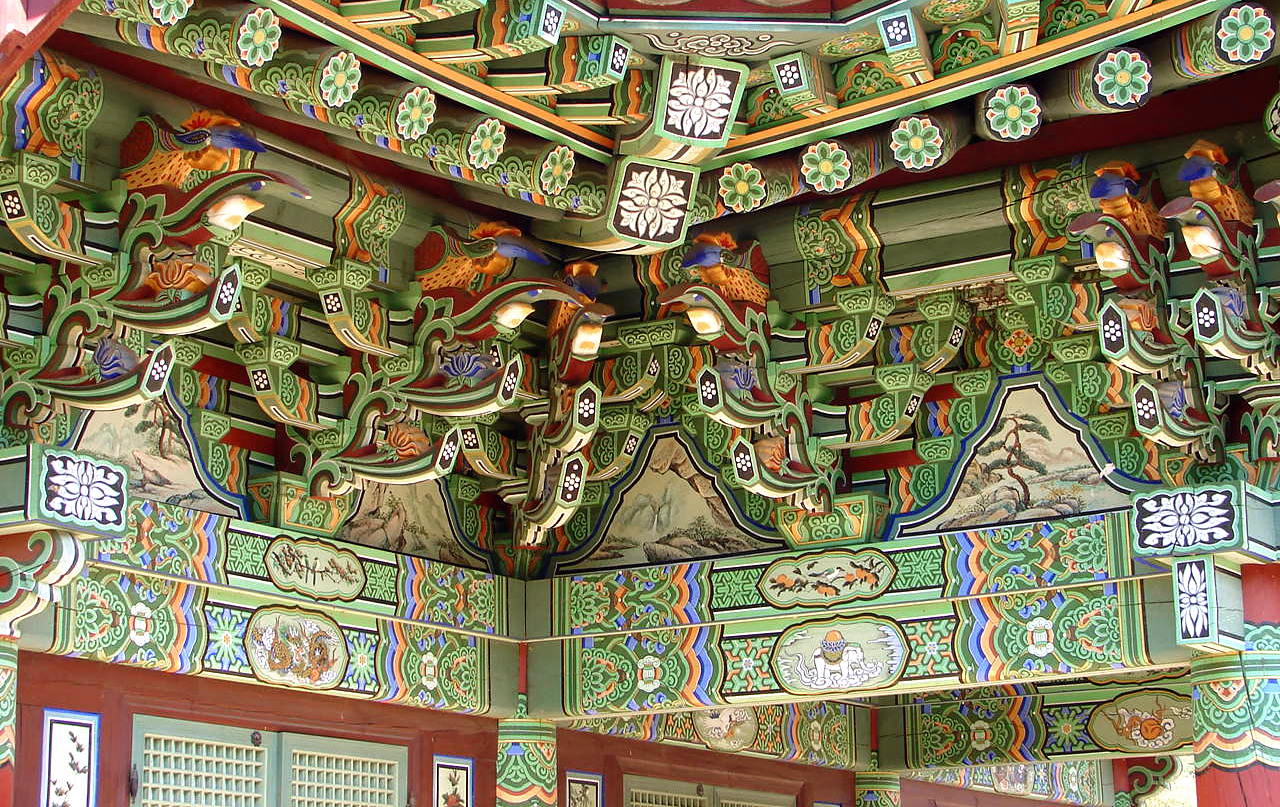
Ssangbongsa temple

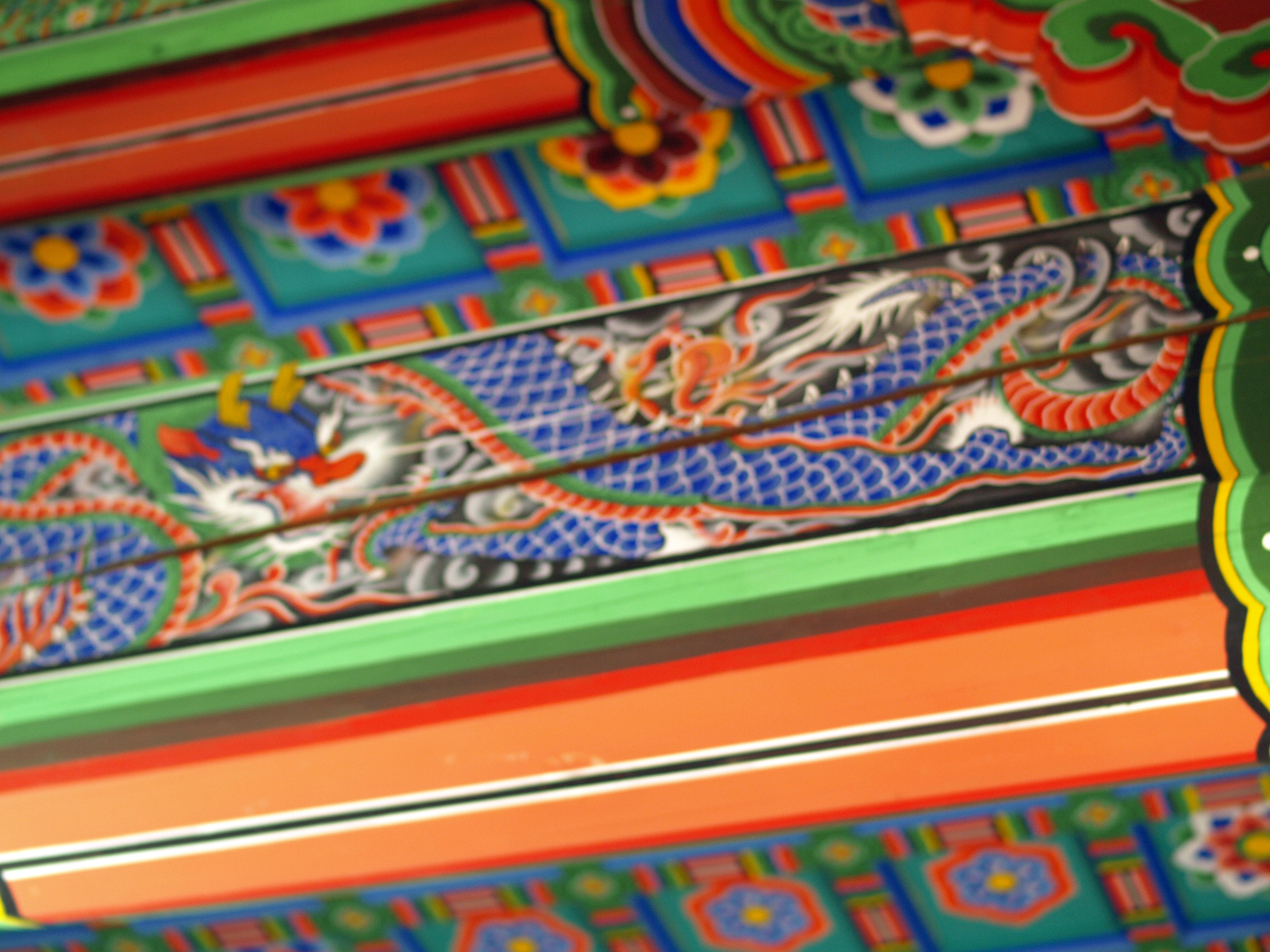
Cheongpeongsa

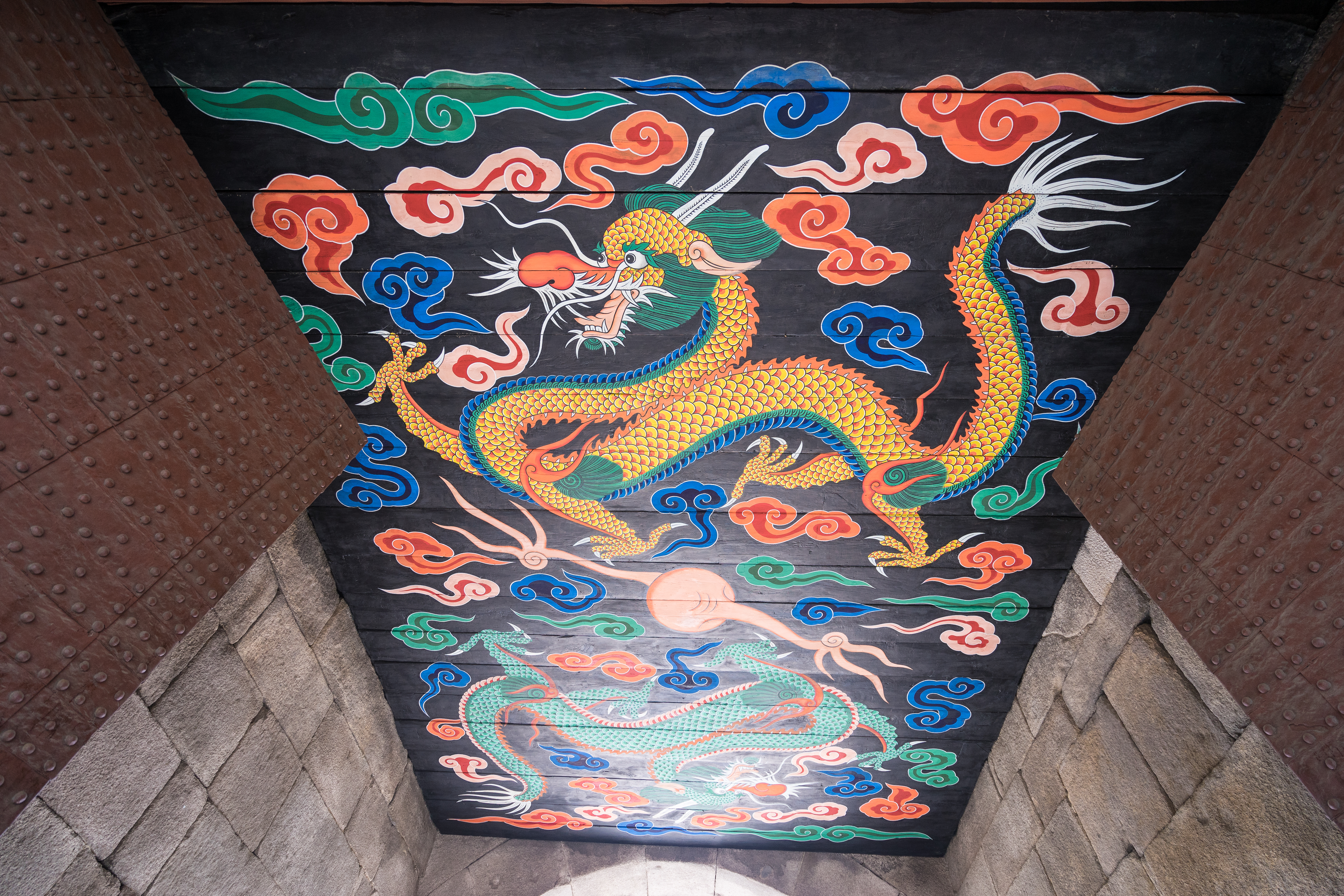
Namdaemun

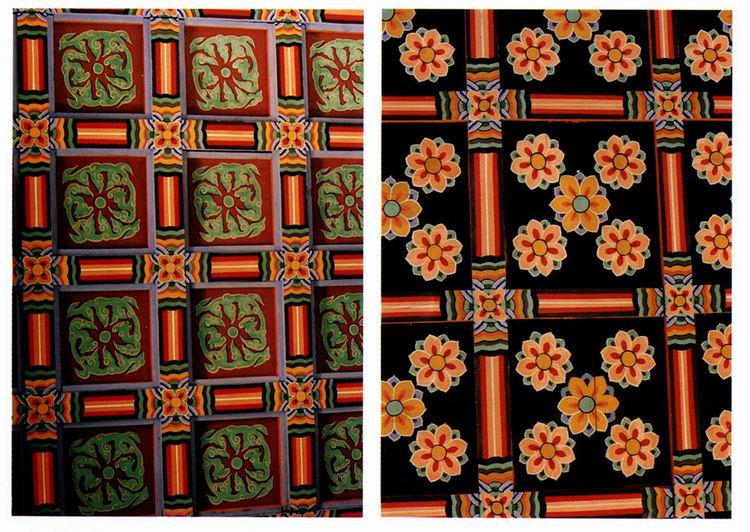
Under Gyeonghoeru pavilion and Gyeongbokgung

== See also ==
- Architecture of Korea
- Hanok
- Korean Buddhist temples
- Important Intangible Cultural Properties of Korea
- Caihua
