= Geungnakjeon =

Type of building in Korean Buddhist temples

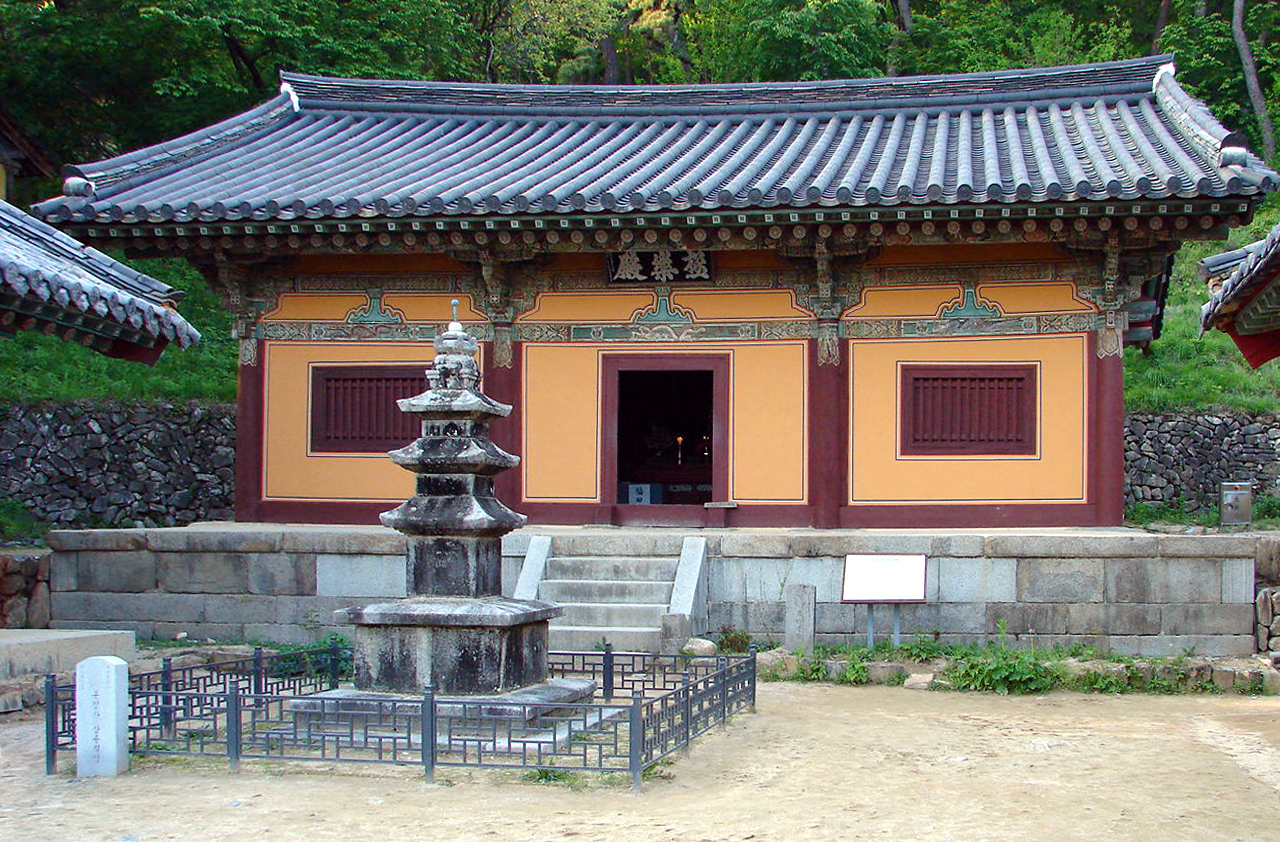
- Geungnakjeon of Bongjeongsa

Korean name
- Hangul: 극락전
- Hanja: 極樂殿
- RR: Geungnakjeon
- MR: Kŭngnakchŏn

Geungnakjeon (Korean: 극락전; Hanja: 極樂殿), also called amitajeon (아미타전; 阿彌陀殿) or muryangsujeon (무량수전; 無量壽殿), is a type of building in Korean Buddhist temples that enshrines Amitābha. The building is named as such because Amitabha is thought to have endless light and life and lead people to Geungnak (Sukhavati). It is sometimes called geungnakbojeon (극락보전; 極樂寶殿) to show respect.

Geungnakjeon is the second most installed beopdang after daeungjeon in Korea. Notable examples are geungnakbojeon of Muwisa, geungnakjeon of Bongjeongsa, and muryangsujeon of Buseoksa which are designated as National Treasure.

== Characteristics ==
As Geungnak is thought be in the west, the building usually faces east so that visitors face west. As Geungnak is also called Anyang (안양; 安養), some temples place structures such as Anyang bridge (안양교) and Anyang pavilion (안양루) near geungnakjeon to give the idea that the entire temple is Geungnak.

Inside the building, a statue of Amitabha is placed in the center with statues of Avalokiteśvara and Mahasthamaprapta at its side. Amitabha is depicted as placing its right hand on its knee and holding the thumb, index finger, and middle finger of its left hand together. Datjip (닫집), a structure made like the eaves of a wooden building, and a sculpture of a dragon with a cintamani in its mouth are placed over the statue. Geungnakhoesangdo (극락회상도; 極樂會上圖), a painting depicting Geungnak, is hung behind it.

== See also ==
- Amida-dō: Similar building in Japanese Buddhist temples

== Gallery ==
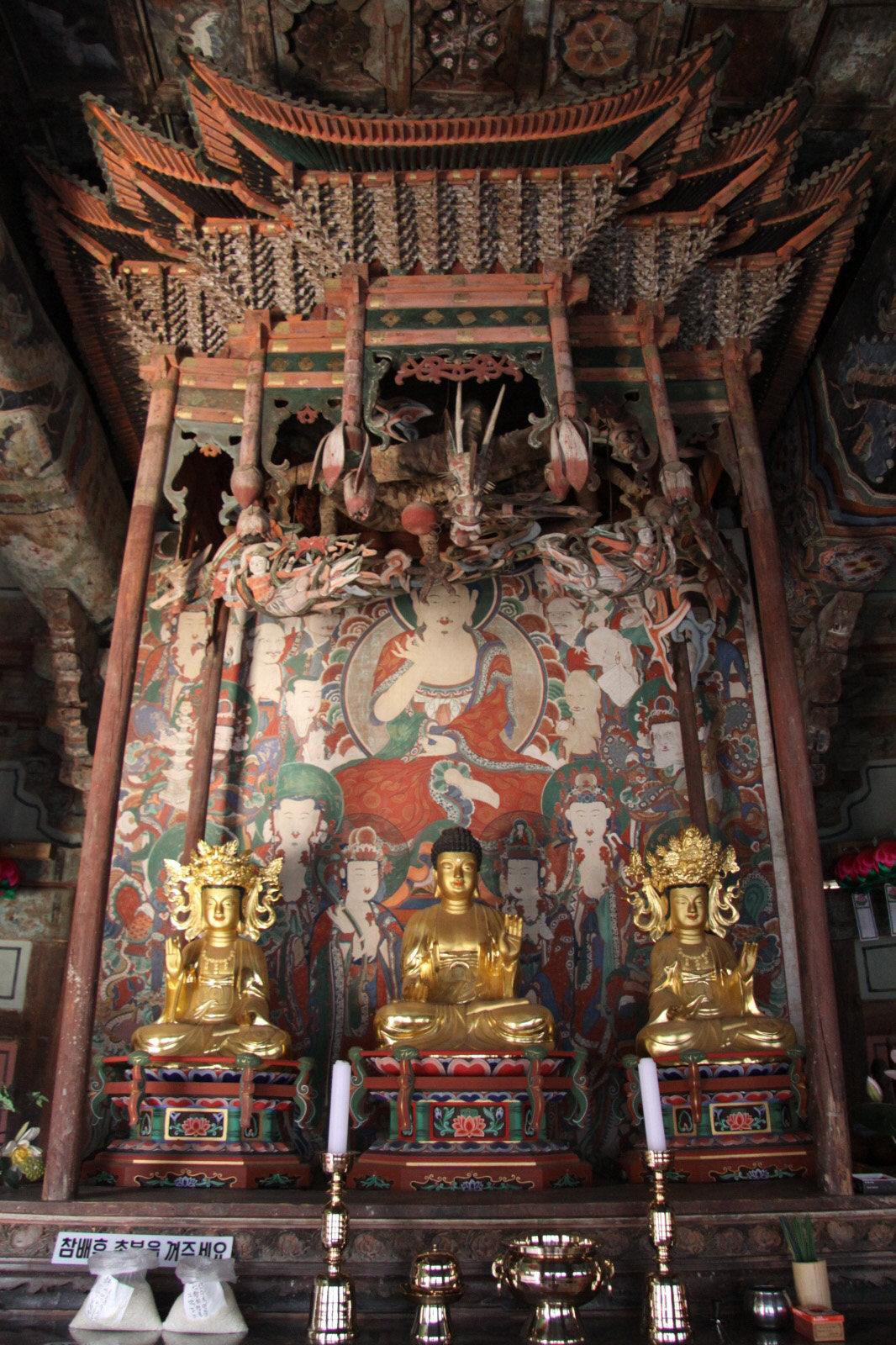
Geungnakjeon of Hwaamsa
