= Muwisa =

- 무위사
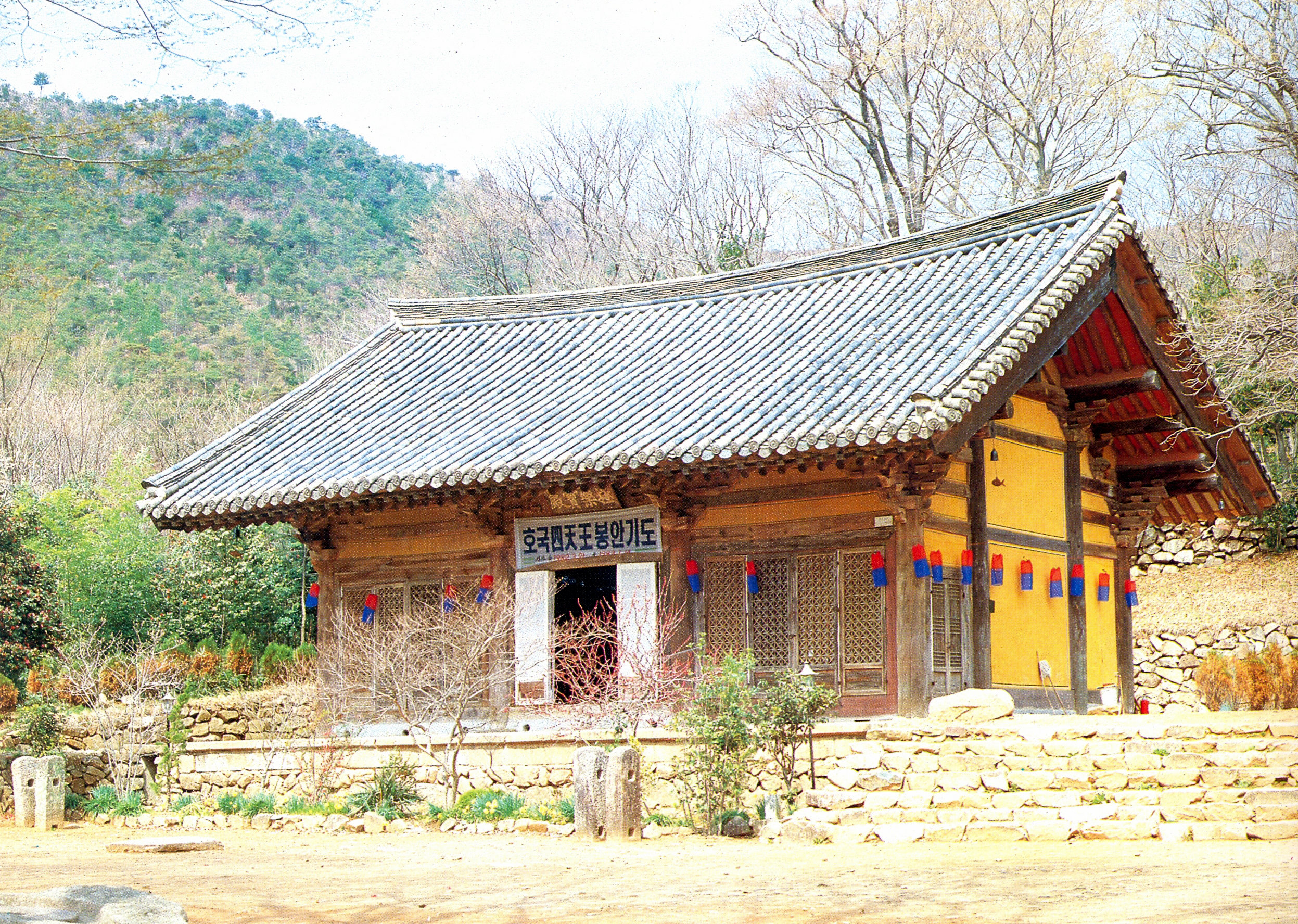
- Geungnakjeon Hall, National Treasure No. 13

- Location within South Korea

Religion
- Affiliation: Buddhism
- District: Gangjin County

Location
- State: South Jeolla
- Country: South Korea
- Coordinates: 34.7384°N 126.6868°E

Architecture
- Founder: Wonhyo
- Completed: 617 A.D.

Muwisa (무위사) is a Buddhist temple in Wolchulsan, Gangjin County, South Jeolla province, South Korea. Geungnakbojeon, National Treasure No. 13, is on the site.

== History ==
Muwisa was built by the monk Wonhyo during the Silla period. Its name has changed several times from Garok to Mook to Muwisa. Though it was first constructed in the 7th century, much of the area was destroyed during the Seven Year War in the 16th century. Until recent years, Geungnakjeon hall and other few parts were all that was left from the fire but due to preservation construction in 1974, Haetalmoon, Bunhyanggak, Chunbuljun, Mireukjun was restored.

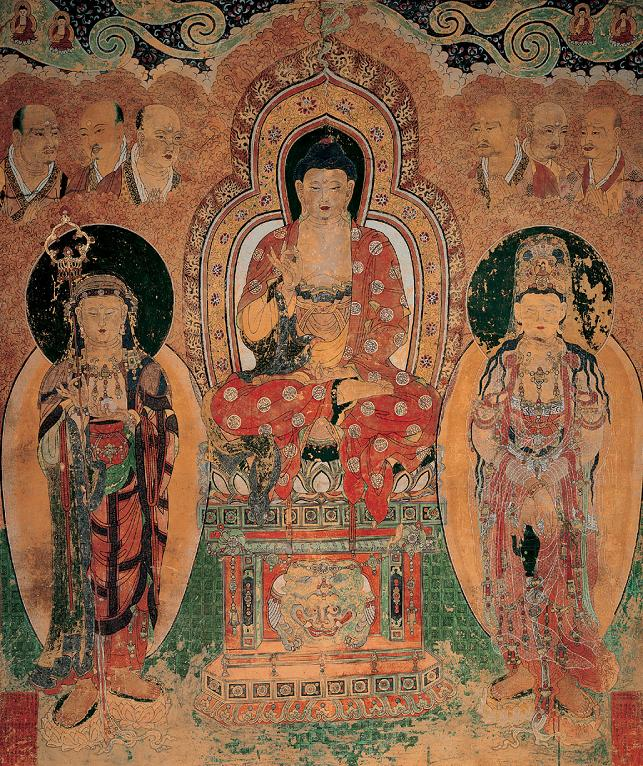
Mural Painting in Geungnakjeon Hall of Muwisa Temple, Gangjin (Amitabha Buddha Triad, 강진 무위사 극락전 아미타여래삼존벽화), National Treasure No. 313
