= Bongjeongsa =

Buddhist temple on the slops of Mt. Cheondeung

Sansa, Buddhist Mountain Monasteries in Korea
UNESCO World Heritage Site
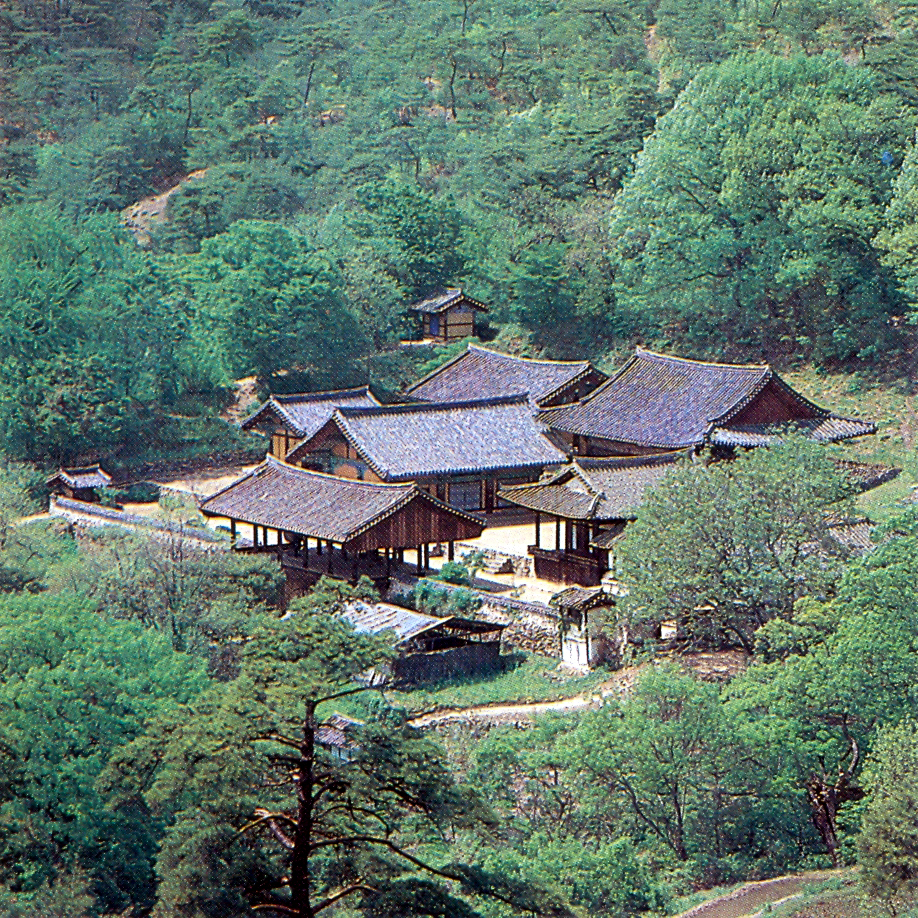

- Location within South Korea
- Location: Andong, Republic of Korea
- Criteria: Cultural: iii
- Reference: 1562-3
- Inscription: 2018 (42nd Session)
- Coordinates: 36°39′12″N 128°39′45.2″E

- Bongjeongsa
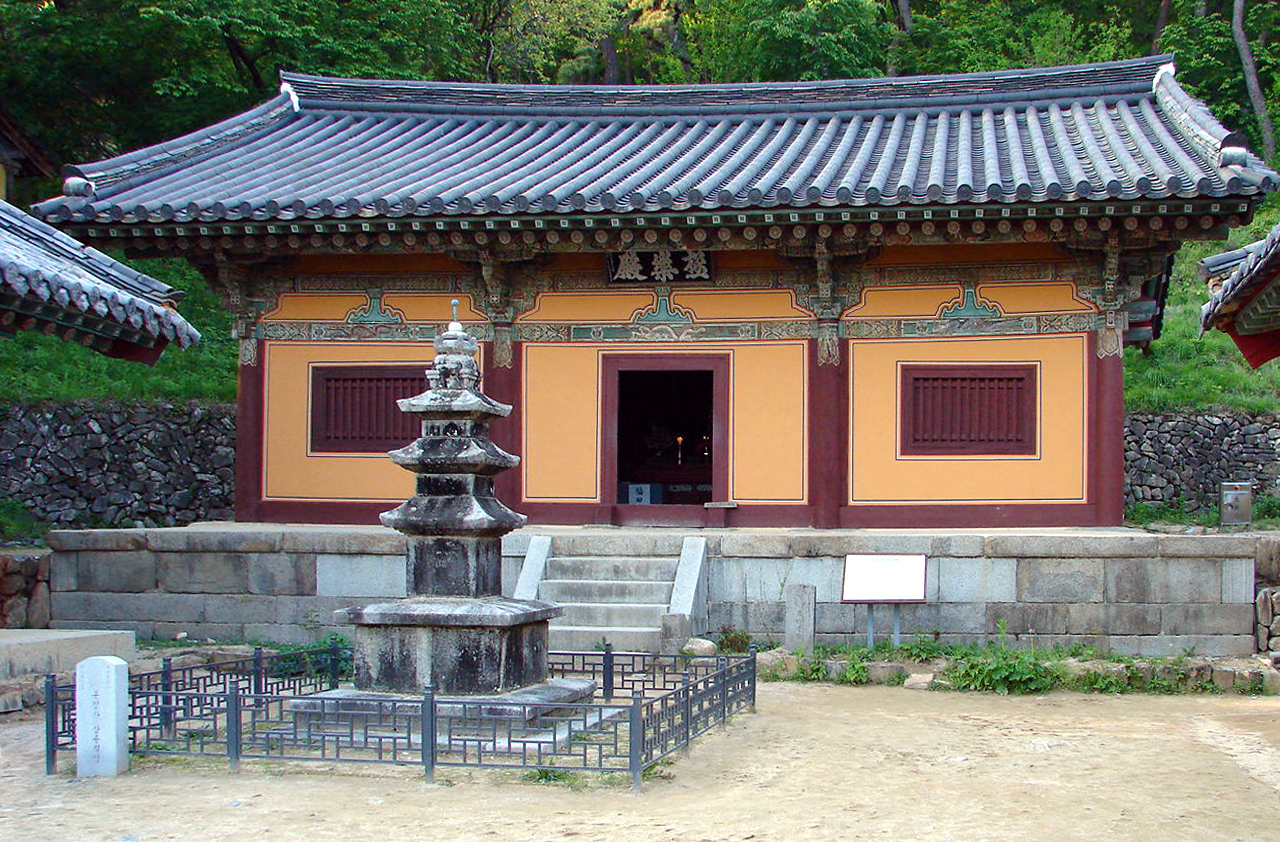
- Geungnakjeon - The oldest wooden building in Korea with the 3-storied pagoda in front at Bongjeongsa.

Korean name
- Hangul: 봉정사
- Hanja: 鳳停寺
- RR: Bongjeongsa
- MR: Pongjŏngsa

Bongjeongsa (Korean: 봉정사) is a Korean Buddhist temple on the slopes of Mount Cheondeung in Andong city, North Gyeongsang Province, South Korea. It is a subsidiary temple of Gounsa, the head temple of the 16th branch of Jogye Order.

At 1,650 m²/17,760 ft², Bongjeongsa is the largest temple in Andong, and is the site of the oldest wooden building, Geungnakjeon, in Korea. There are 10 buildings at the main temple and a total of 9 other buildings at Bongjeongsa's two sub temples found to the east and west of the main temple complex.

This temple constitutes the oldest example of wooden architecture in Korea. During her trip to Korea in 1999, Queen Elizabeth II of the United Kingdom was particularly impressed by the scale and beauty of Bongjeonsa Temple.

== Origin ==
Bongjeongsa is believed first established by Monk Uisang in 672 during the 12th year of King Munmu of Silla (661-681), however, an inscription found during a restoration of Geuknakjeon state that Neungin Daedeuk, a disciple of Monk Uisang, established the temple.

In 1363 the last major reconstruction took place and in 1625 and 1972, renovations were undertaken.

== Treasures ==
=== National Treasure #15 ===
Geungnakjeon (Nirvana Hall), dates back to the early 1200s, is presumed to be the oldest wooden building in South Korea. Originally called Daejangjeon, it was formerly the main hall of Beongjeongsa Temple.

The hall was constructed with slated windows on both sides, with the door in the front middle compartment, and has a gabled roof supported by column brackets. Inside the hall, a Buddhist statue is placed and decorated in an ornamental canopy, while the Buddhist altar is carved with a scroll design. Though built during the Goryeo Dynasty era, the hall shows influence of the architectural style of the early Unified Silla Period.

=== National Treasure #311 ===
Daeungjeon is the main temple hall, with stunning original murals, representing building styles of the early Joseon Dynasty era. Notable for the style of pillars, most likely brought from Song dynasty, Daeungjeon incorporates a column-head and curved bracket form.

=== Treasure #448 ===
Hwaeom Gangdang, a study hall, constructed in 1588 during the mid-Joseon Dynasty.

=== Treasure #449 ===
Gogeumdang, a small worship hall, constructed in 1616.

=== Gyeongsangbuk-do Cultural Heritage #325 ===
Manseru is a building that was constructed during the reign of King Sukjong of Joseon, and serves as a gateway to the main hall of the temple. On November 1, 2001, it was designated as Gyeongsangbuk-do tangible national treasure No. 325.

=== Gyeongsangbuk-do Cultural Heritage #182 ===
The three-story stone pagoda was designated as Kyongsangbuk-do Tangible Cultural Heritage No. 182 on December 29, 1984. It is 318 cm tall, and is believed to have been made during the mid- Goryeo Dynasty.

== Gallery ==
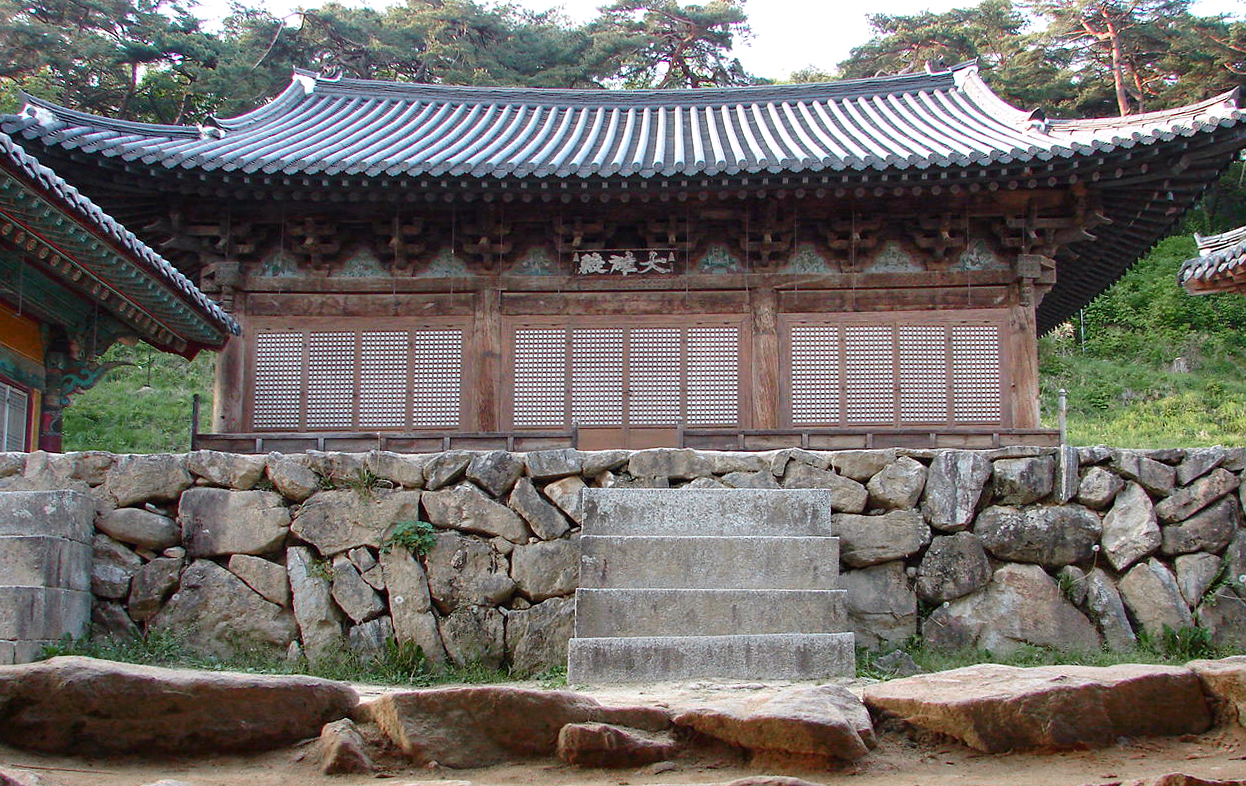
Bongjeongsa Daeungjeon - National Treasure #311

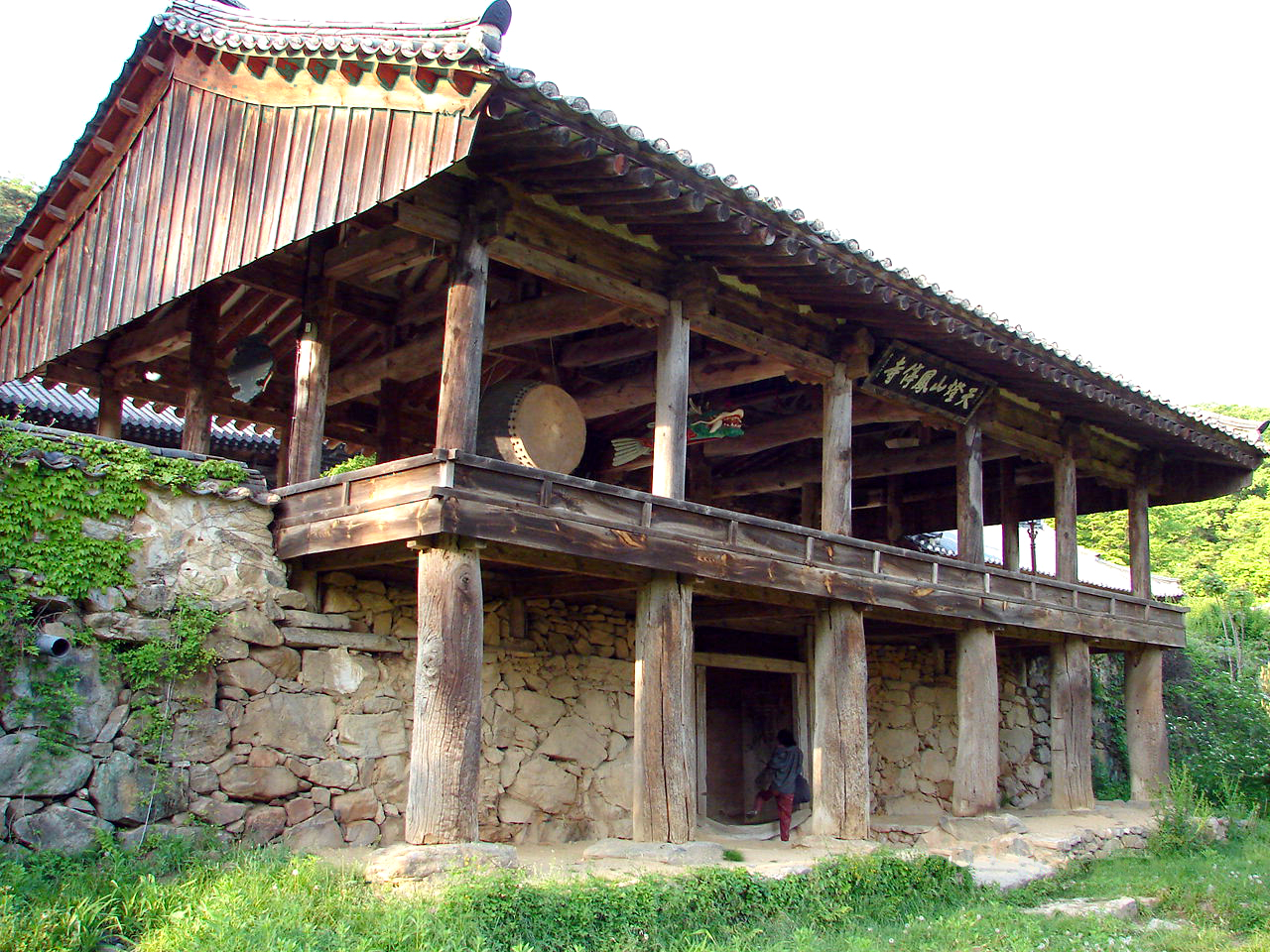
Bongjeongsa Maseru

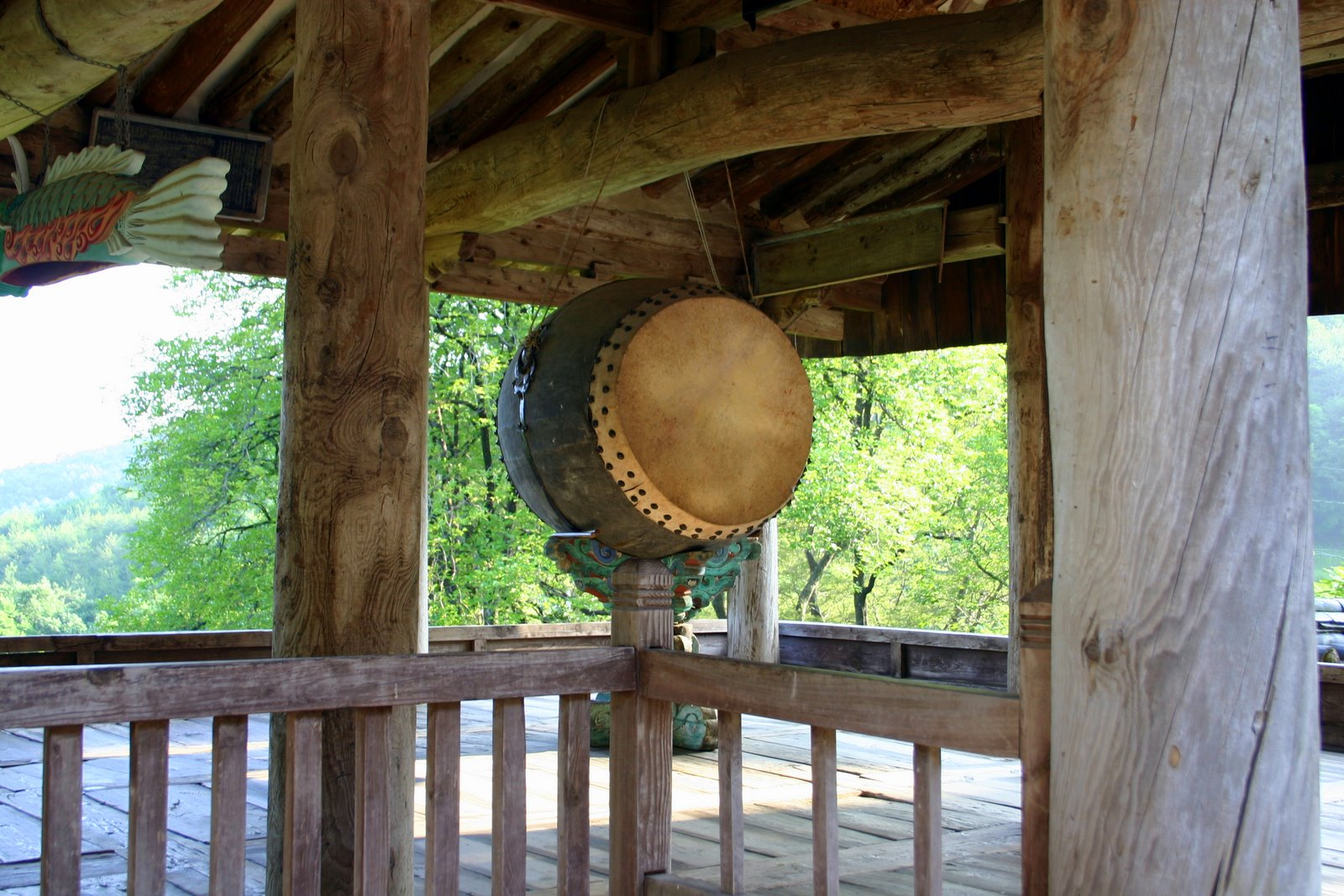
Drum and wooden fish in the Bongjeongsa Manseru pavilion

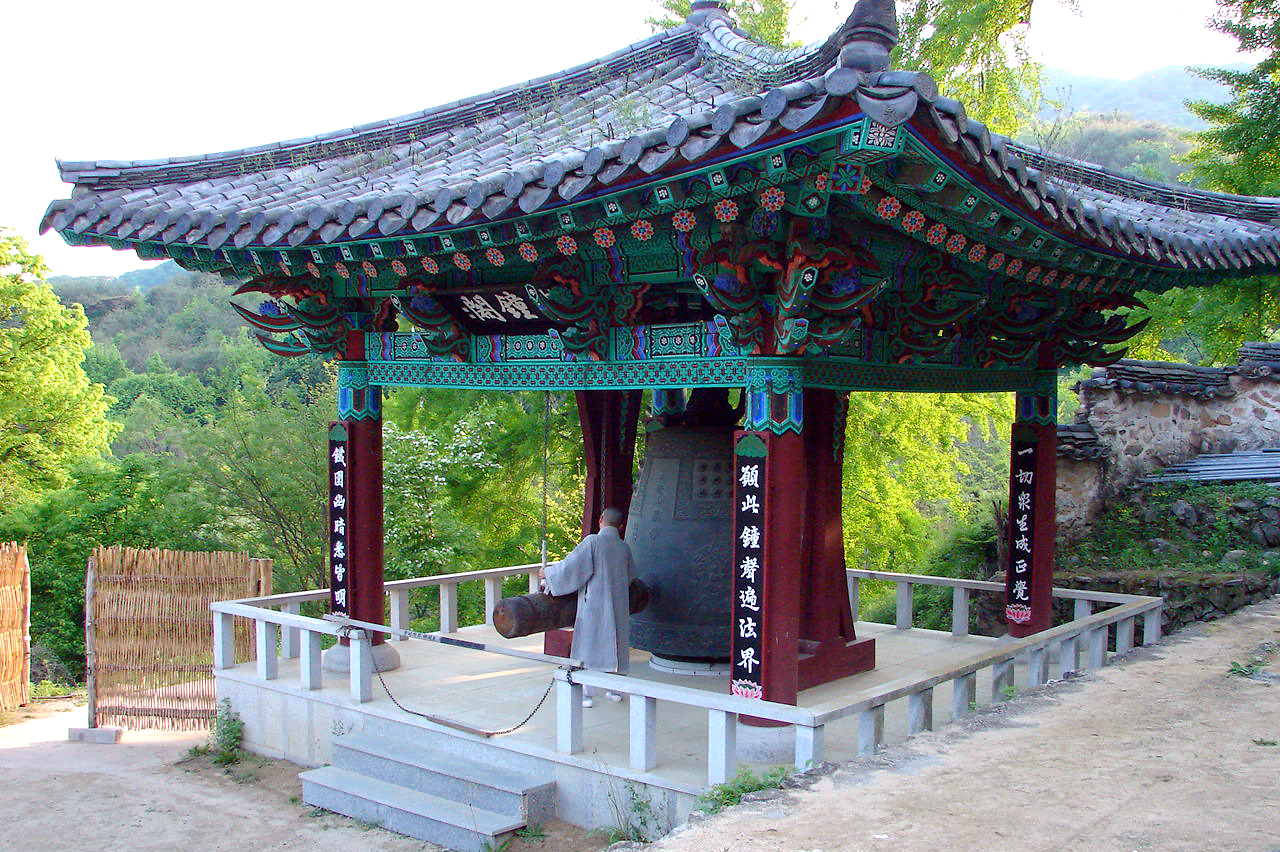
Bongjeongsa Bell Pavilion

== See also ==
- Bulguksa
- Korean Buddhist temples
