= Buseoksa =

Buddhist temple in South Korea

- 부석사
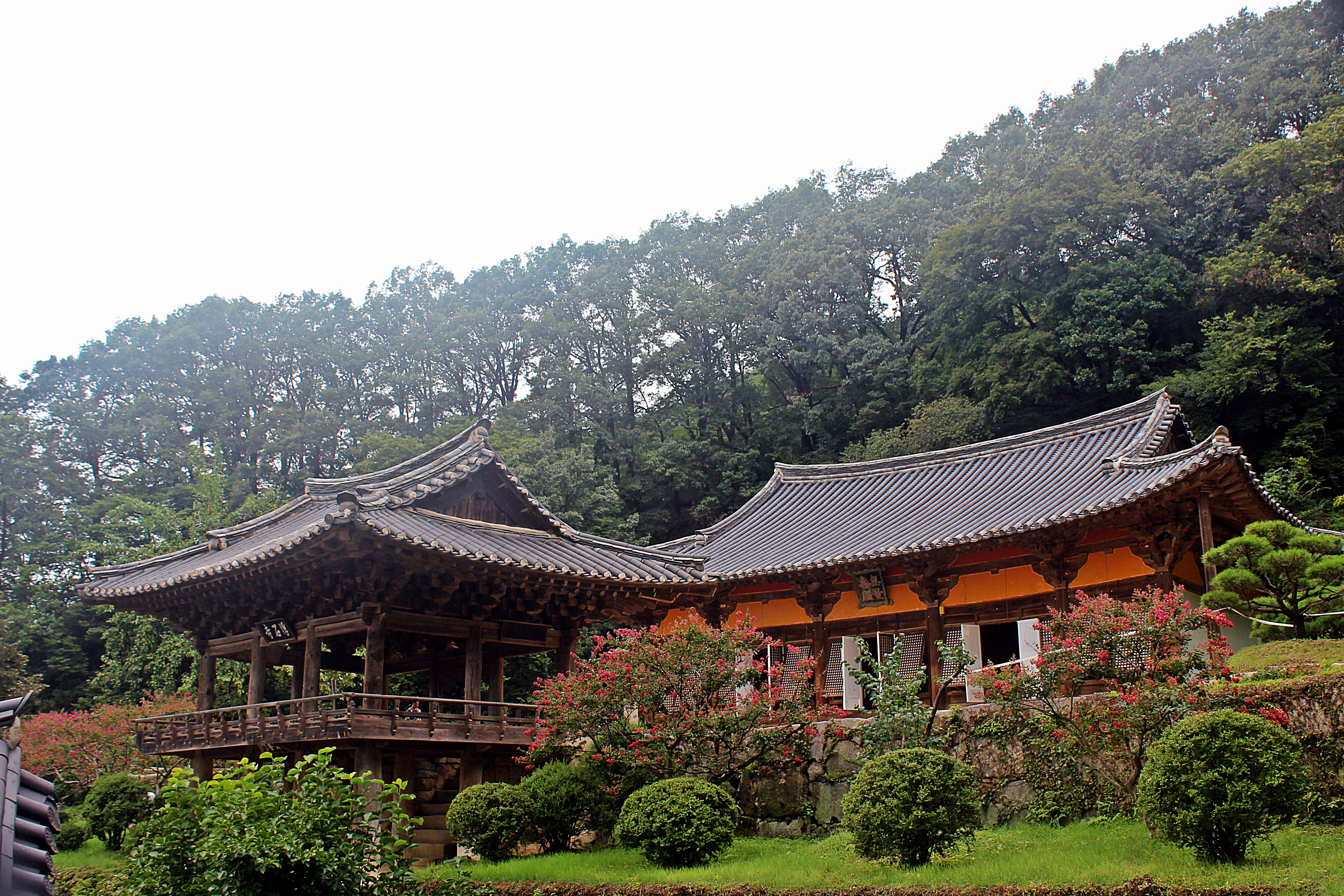
- Muryangsujeon Hall of Buseoksa Temple

Location
- Location: Buseok-myeon, Yeongju
- Country: South Korea
- Interactive map of Buseoksa
- Coordinates: 36°59′56″N 128°41′15″E

Architecture
- UNESCO World Heritage Site
- Criteria: Cultural: iii
- Designated: 2018
- Parent listing: Sansa, Buddhist Mountain Monasteries in Korea
- Reference no.: 1562-5

Korean name
- Hangul: 부석사
- Hanja: 浮石寺
- RR: Buseoksa
- MR: Pusŏksa

Buseoksa (Korean: 부석사; Hanja: 浮石寺) is a Buddhist temple located near the mountain Bonghwangsan in Buseok-myeon, Yeongju, South Korea. It was founded by the prominent scholar-monk Uisang in 676.

Korean Huayan school was highly celebrated here by the lectures of Uisang, who was later called the respected scholar of Buseok and later the school also gained the name Buseok school. The temple houses the Muryangsujeon, which is the second oldest standing wooden building in South Korea, re-constructed in 1376.

In 1372, large numbers of annexes were re-established by the great monk Won-eung at the time under King Gongmin's reign in 1376. A few buildings during Goryeo era (9th century to the late 14th century) remain until now, one of which is the main hall called Muryangsujeon located at the highest level, where Amitabha is enshrined.

== Legend ==
According to Samguk yusa, which is the oldest remaining historical record of this region, there was a Chinese lady named Sunmyo who admired Uisang while his study in Tang China. Uisang was to leave Tang after finishing his study, and she dedicated herself so deeply and ended up transforming herself into a dragon to help him go over the challenges on his way back to Shilla.

It is said she expelled the evils which blocked Uisang from building the temple at the current site. She hang huge stones high up in the sky upon heads of the evils. There is a huge "floating" stone just next to Muryangsujeon (Buseok means 'floating stone' in Korean).

== History ==
In the era of Uisang were several conflicts among the norms of Buddhism. He would like to accomplish the harmonious values between denominations and among people in social context. The conflicts were the impact of unification of Silla after a long war with Tang China. To harmonize subjected people, the royal power was required to establish the center of spiritual contents, one of which was to build the temples based on Uisang's Huayan school. In this way, each central area came to hold one Huayan temple in the end, leading to back off from chaotic social and political instability in the late 7th century.

During the Goryeo dynasty, the temple was called as Seondal or Heunggyo temple. In 1916, stained paper was found to tell that Muryangsujeon building had been re-built in early years of Goryeo whereas there was arson of enemy in 1358. Muryangsujeon and Josadong shrine were built in 1376 and in 1377, respectively.

== Architecture ==
Koreans perceive the ability to harmonize building and nature as the essence of architecture, Buseoksa is located on a steep mountain. Ancient architects sought to arrange buildings in a manner which made the maximization of the adjoining land possible, rather than digging and turning inclined land into a plain, they preferred to create a plain by building stone walls along the slope of the mountain and then arranging the buildings accordingly. There are a grand total of nine stone walls on the temple grounds. Koreans regard these nine sets of stairs linked to the stone walls as representing the nine stairs toward Mandala or the nine staircases which one must traverse in order to reach Nirvana.

== Cultural assets ==
As the oldest building, the temple cherishes several assets: 5 national treasures, 8 treasures and 2 tangible regional assets.

- National Treasures of South Korea
  - Stone lantern in front of Muryangsujeon Hall (No.17)
  - Muryangsujeon Hall of Buseoksa Temple (No.18)
  - Josadang Hall of Buseoksa Temple(No.19)
  - Seated clay statue of Amitabha Buddha (No.45)
  - Wall painting in Josadang Hall of Buseoksa Temple (No.46)

== Gallery ==
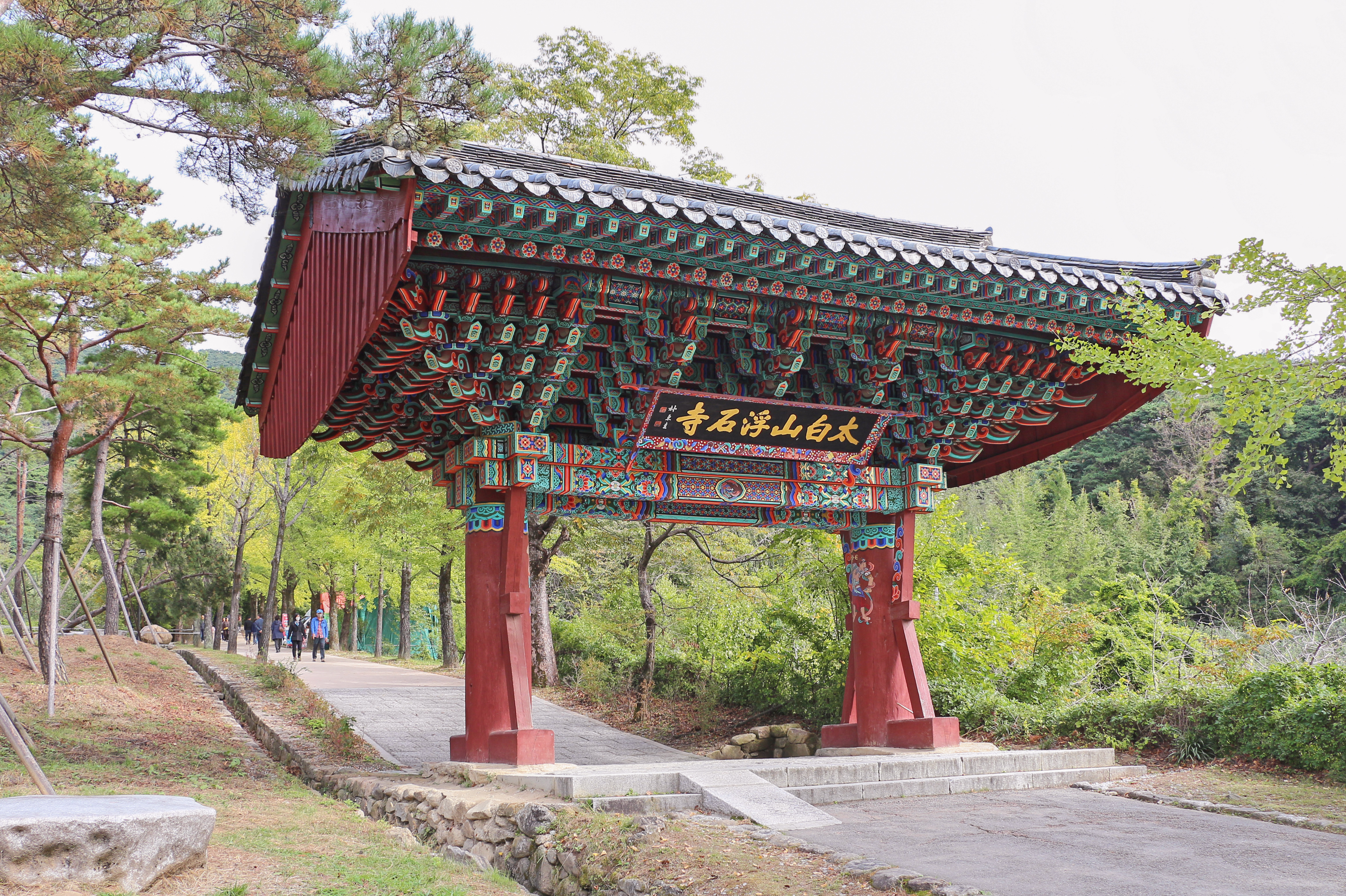
Iljumun

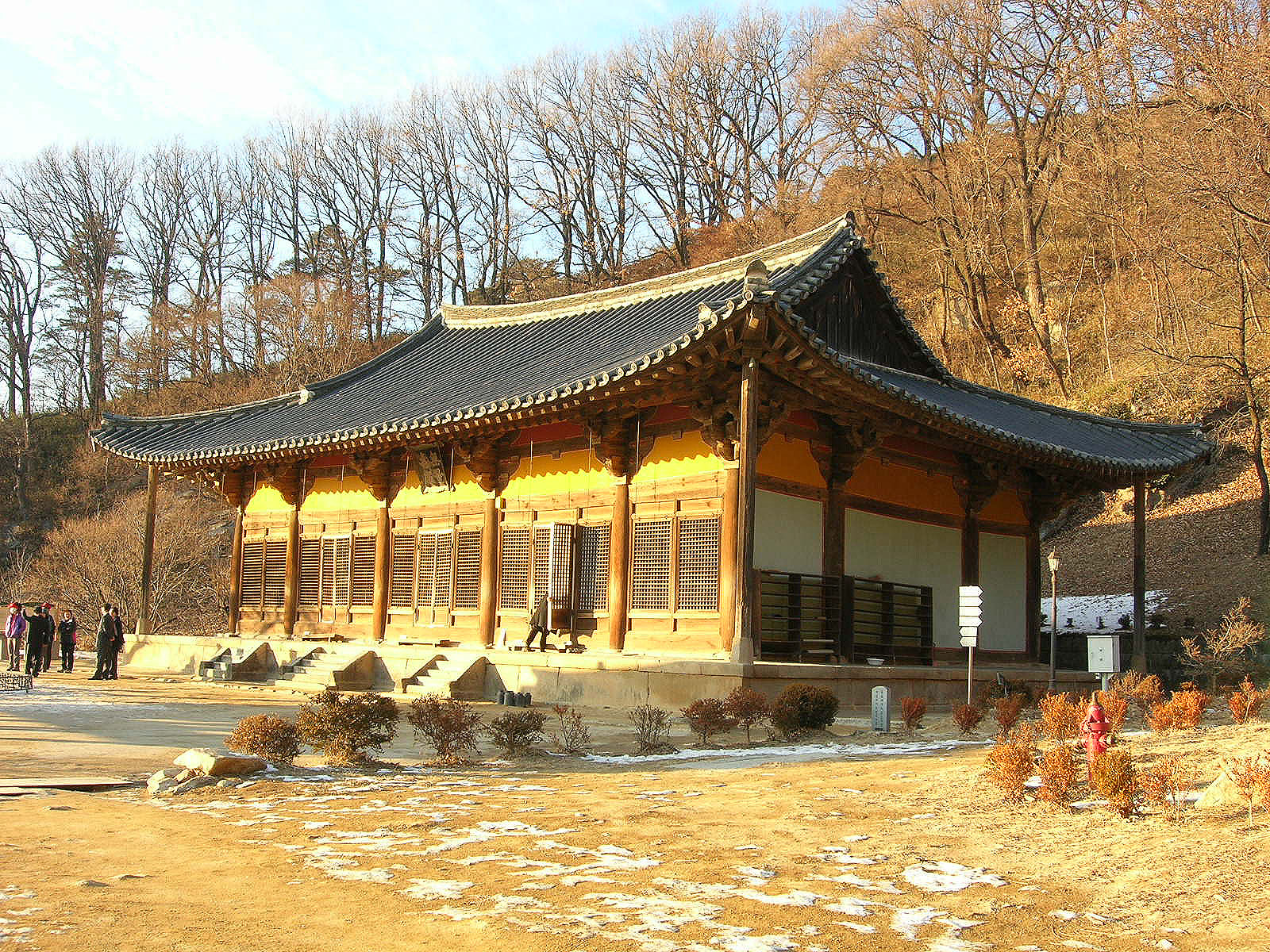
Muryangsujeon

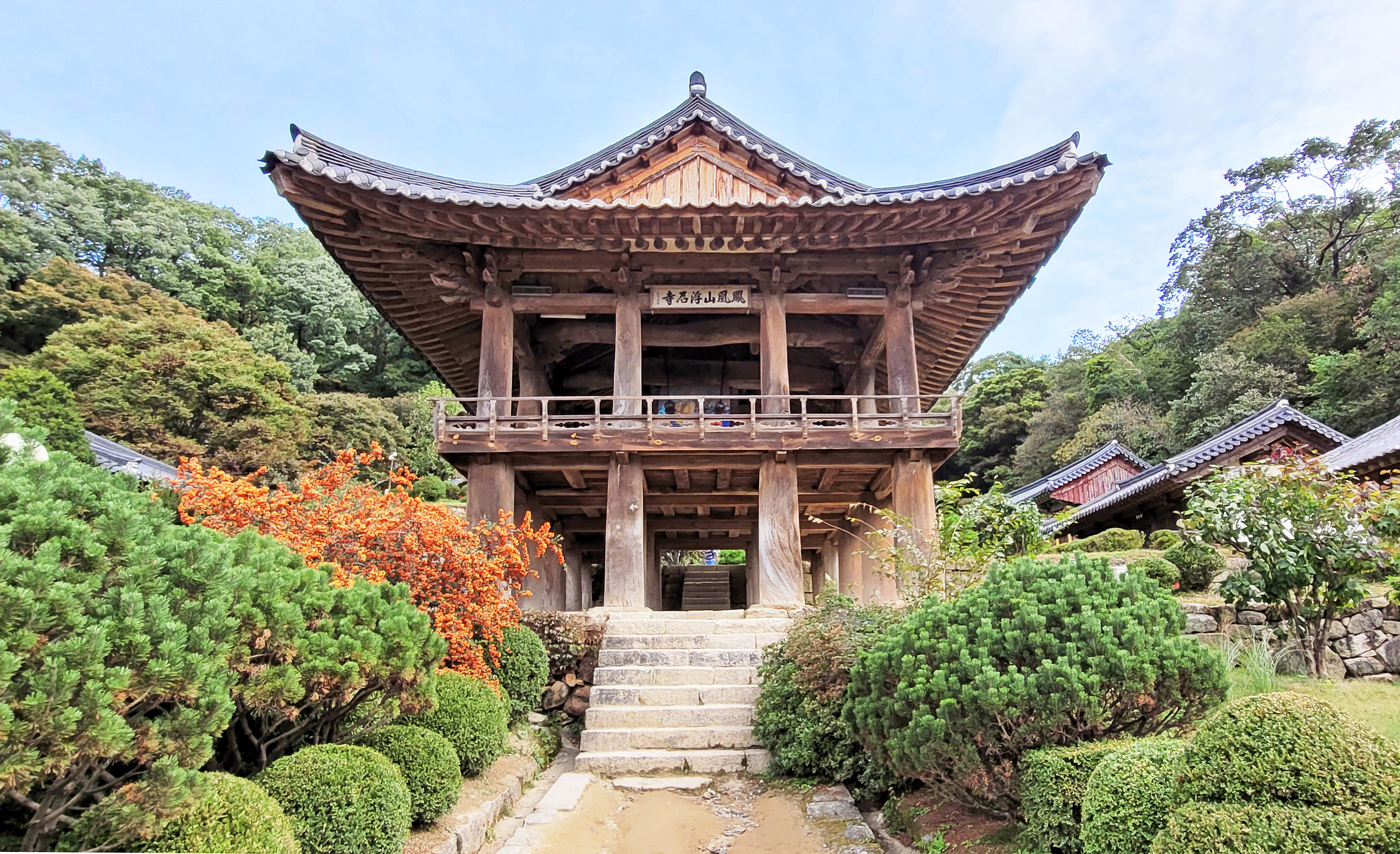
Beomjongnu

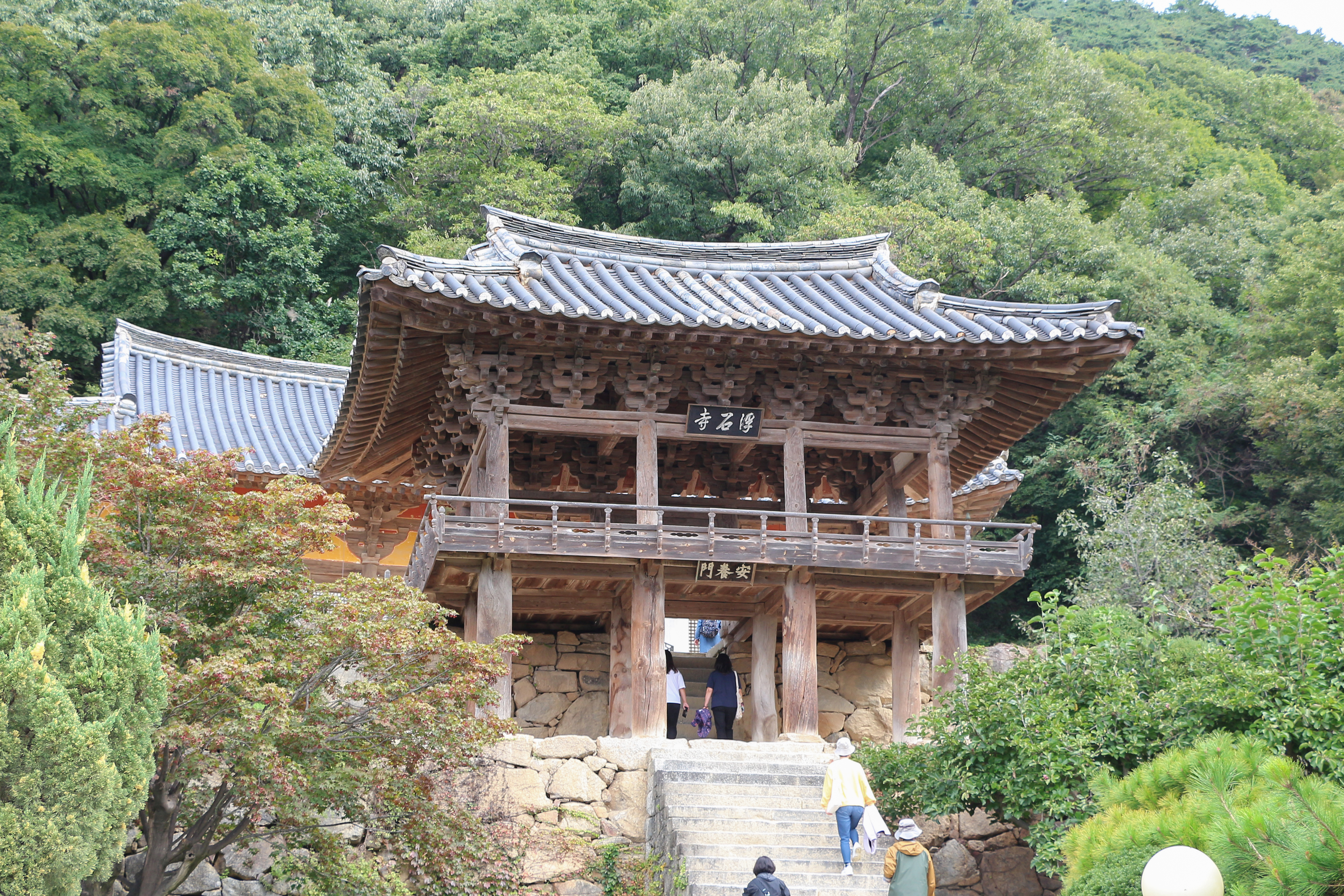
Anyangnu

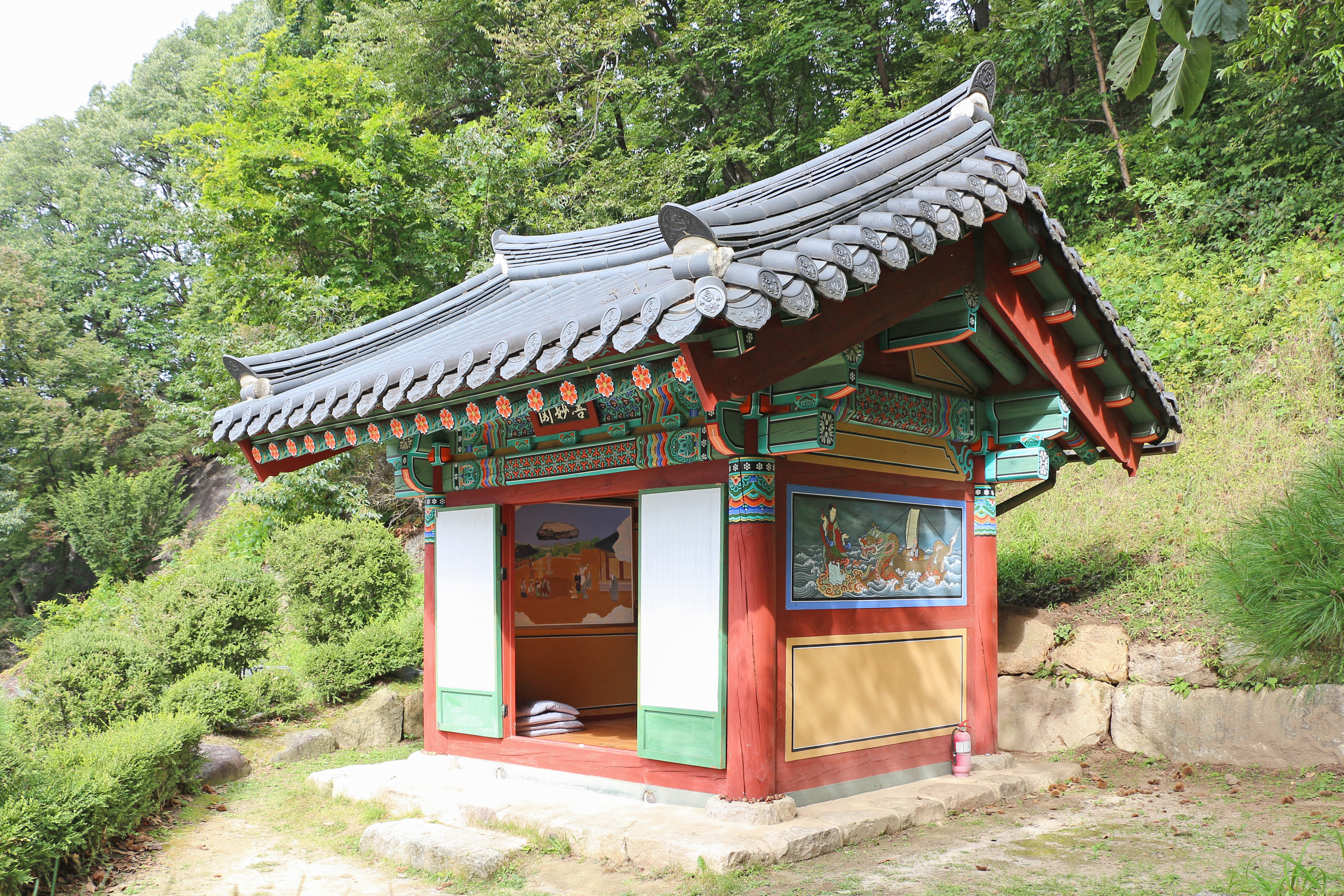
Seonmyogak

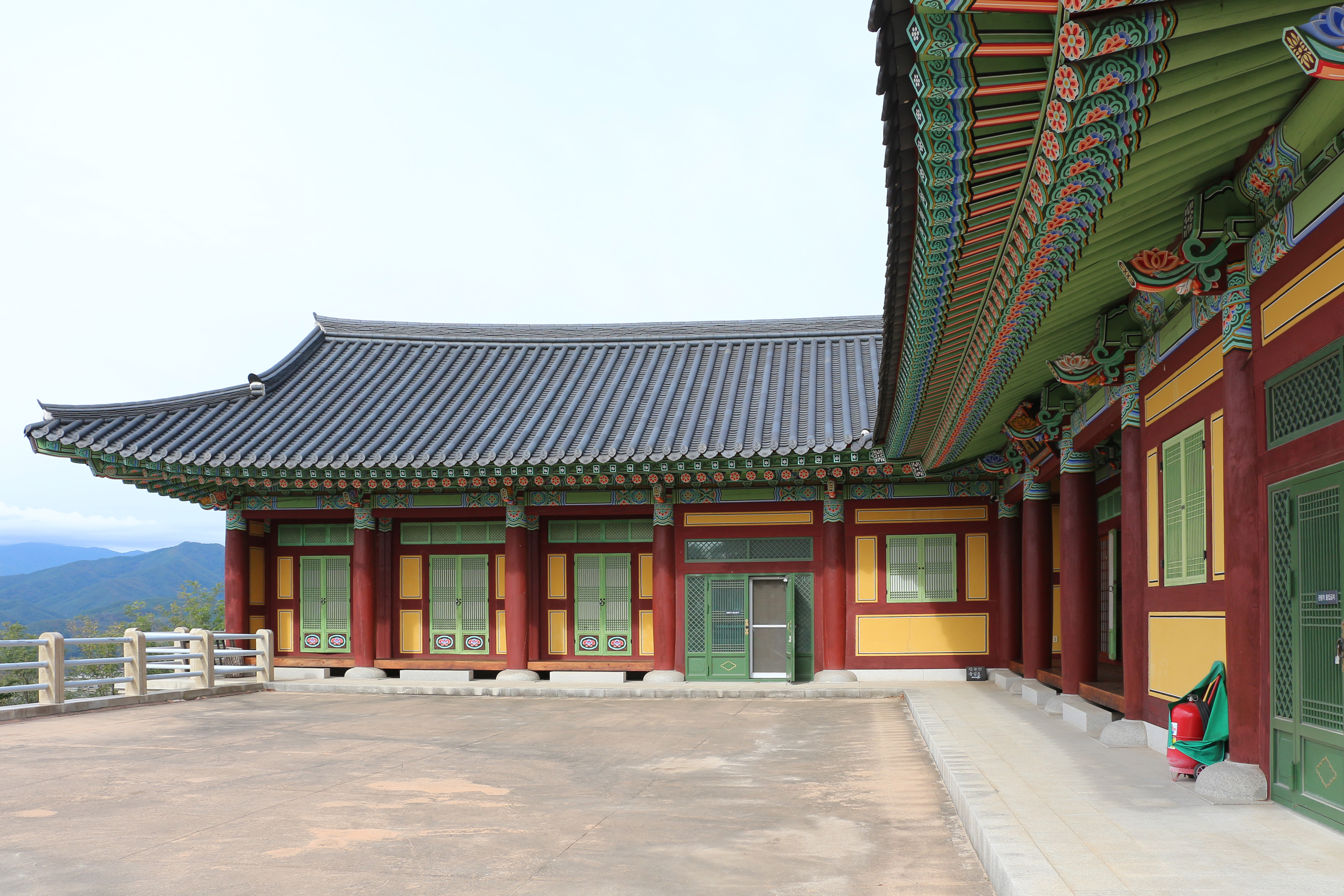
Gwaneumjeon

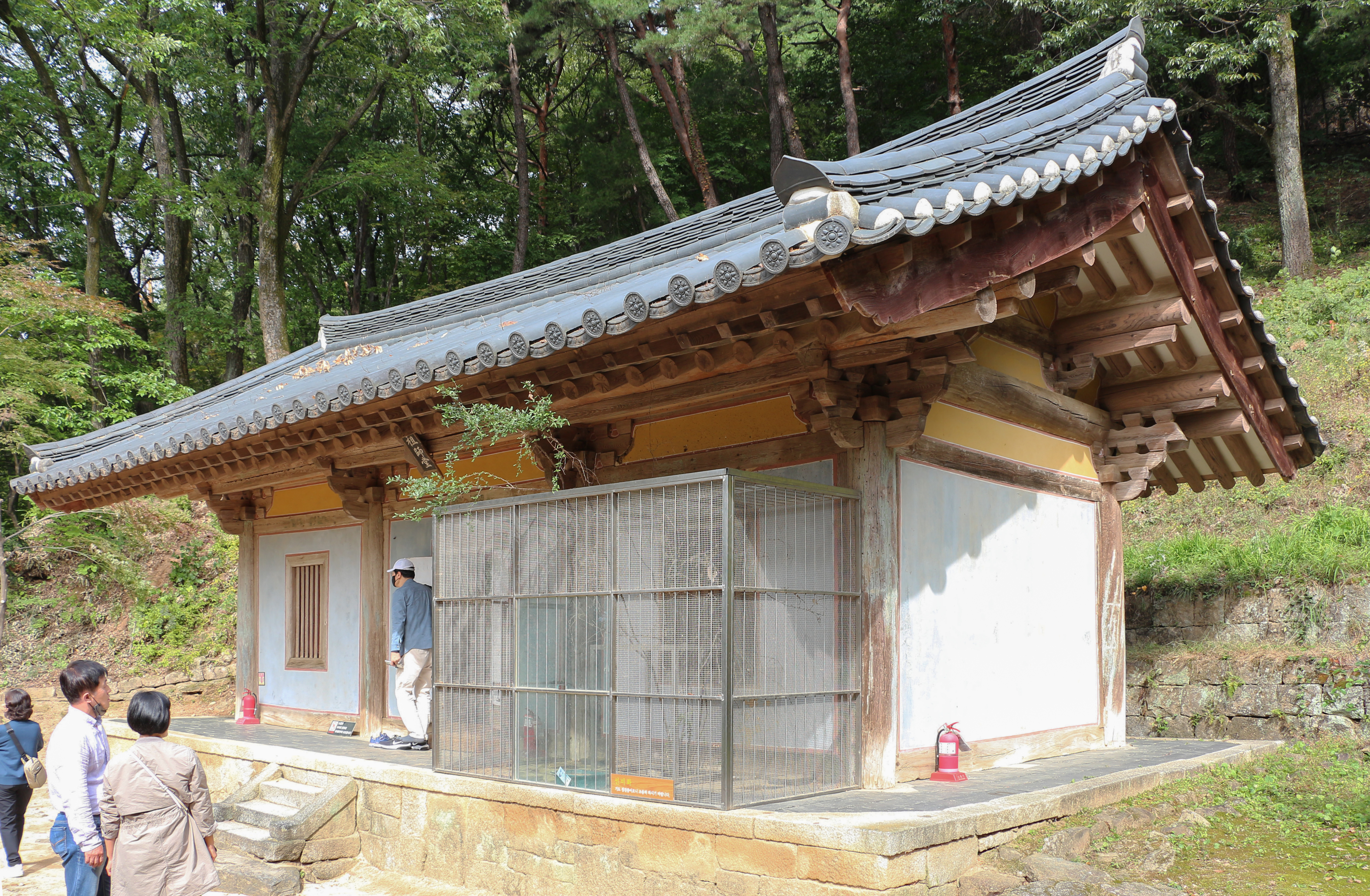
Josadang

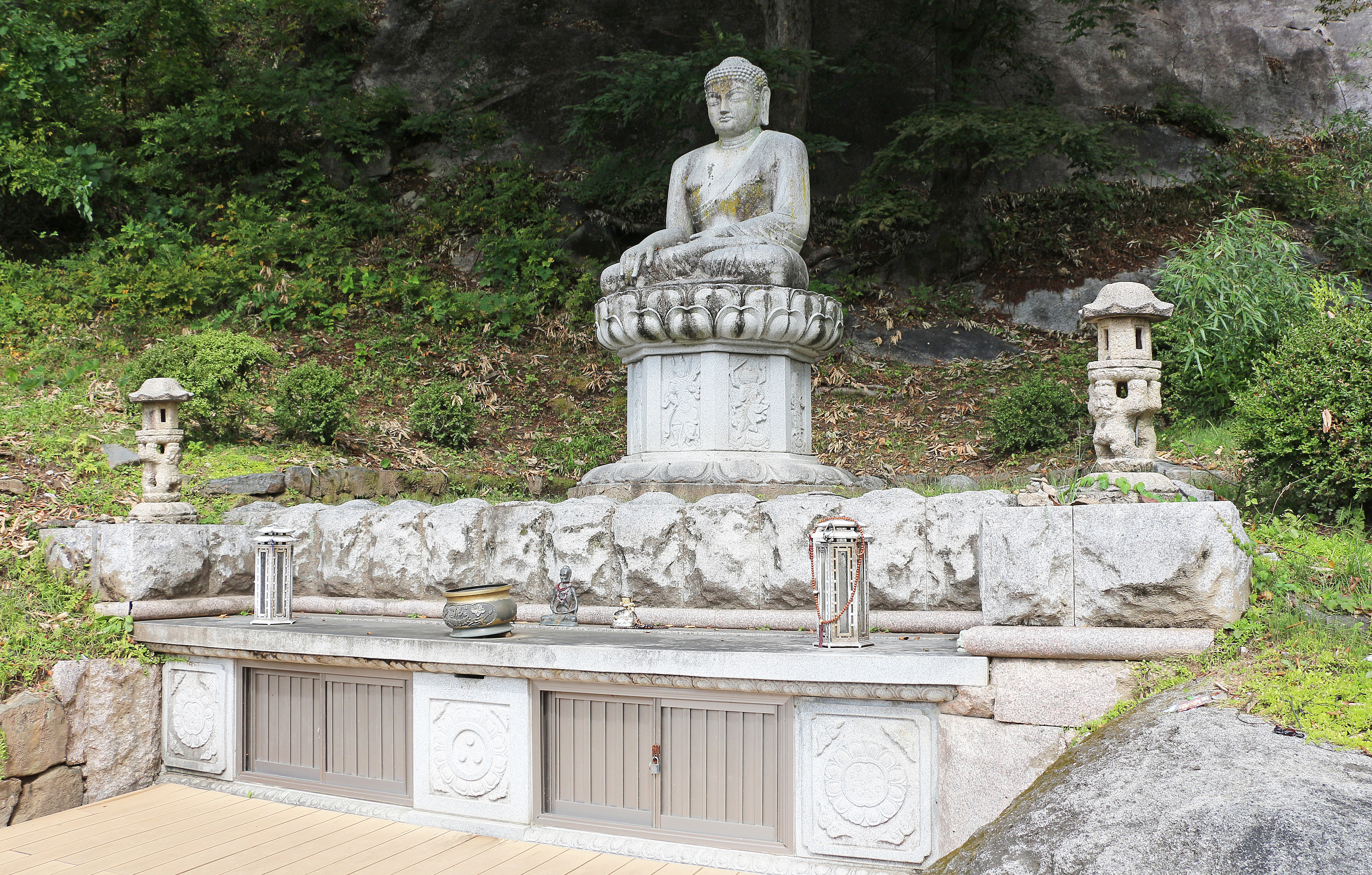
Clay Seated Buddha

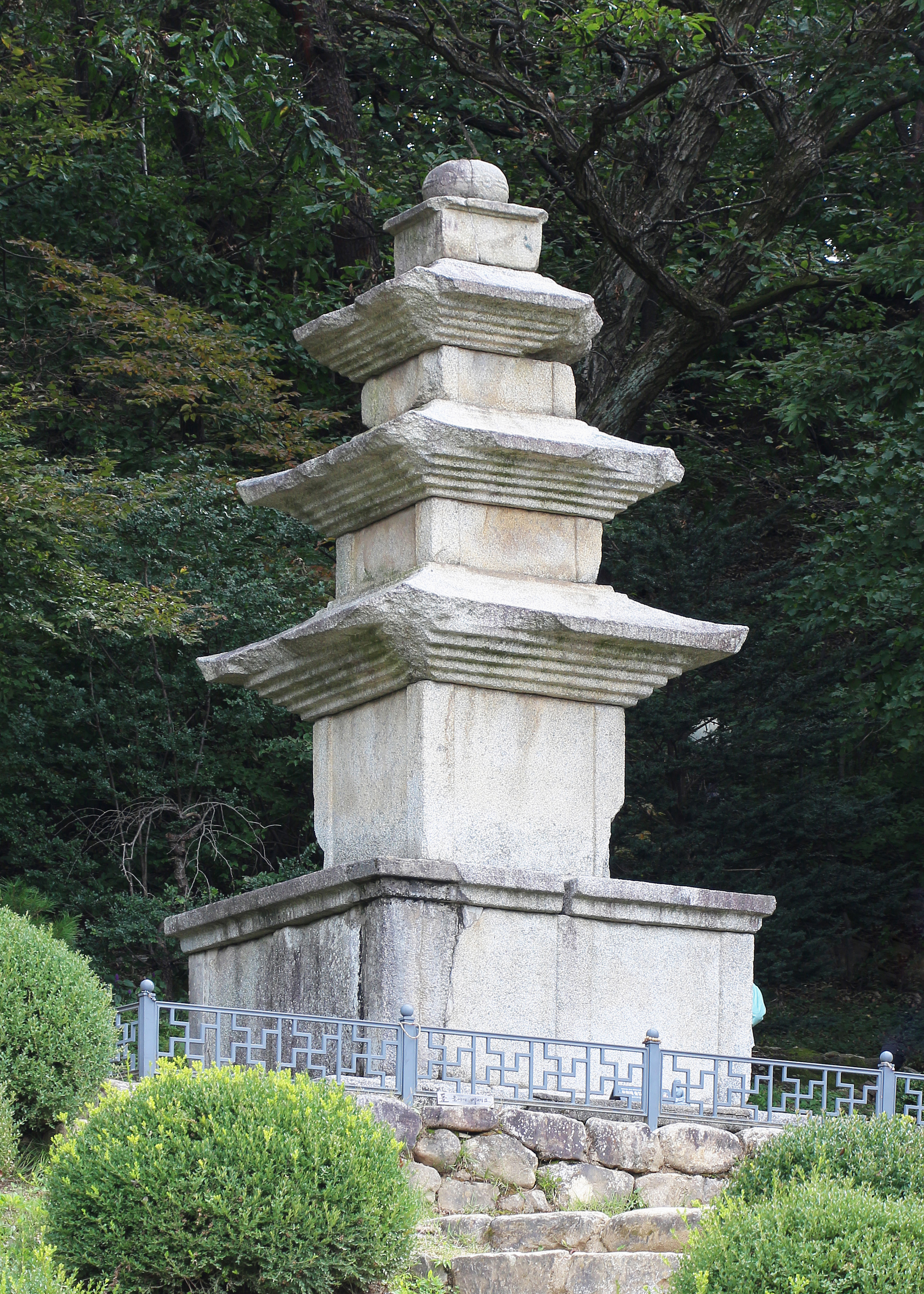
Three-story stone pagoda

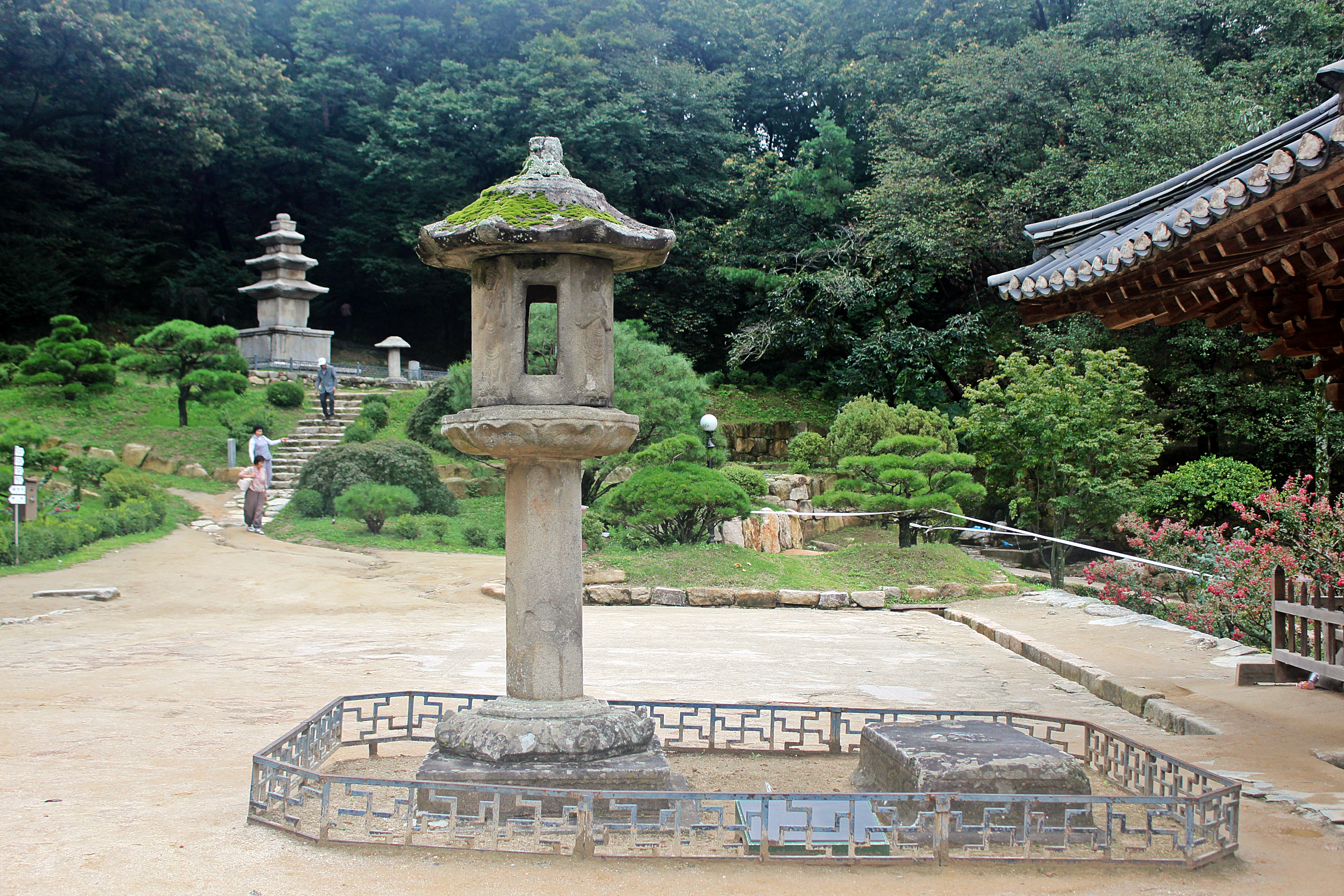
Stone lantern
- Photo Gallery of the official website
