= Burimun =

Type of gate in Korean Buddhist temples

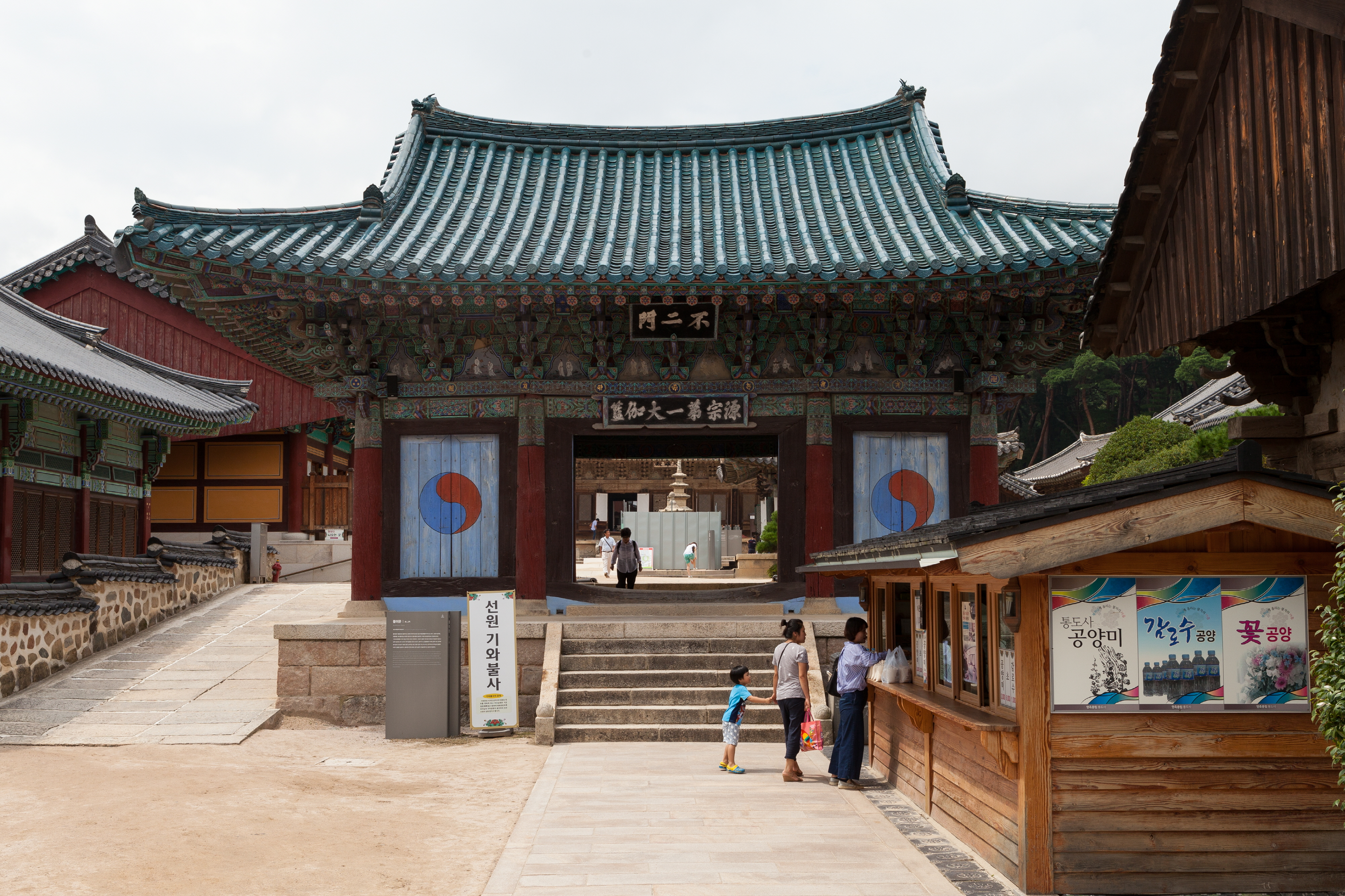
- Burimun of Tongdosa in Yangsan

Korean name
- Hangul: 불이문
- Hanja: 不二門
- RR: burimun
- MR: purimun

Burimun (Korean: 불이문; Hanja: 不二門) or haetalmun (해탈문; 解脫門) is the last of the three gates leading to Korean Buddhist temples. Passing through iljumun, sacheonwangmun, and burimun symbolizes leaving Sahā and entering Pure Land. Some temples build pavilions instead of this gate.

Non-duality (불이; 不二; buri) means that all phenomena in the world are ultimately not separate. The gate also symbolizes that only by reaching the state of non-duality can one proceed to the realm of the Buddha. Thus, once passing through this gate, geumdang (main hall) comes directly into view.

A notable example is haetalmun of Dogapsa which is designated as national treasure.

== See also ==
- Iljumun: first gate of Korean Buddhist temples
- Sacheonwangmun: second gate of Korean Buddhist temples
