= Wolchulsan National Park =

National park in South Korea

- 월출산국립공원, 月出山國立公園
- IUCN category II (national park)
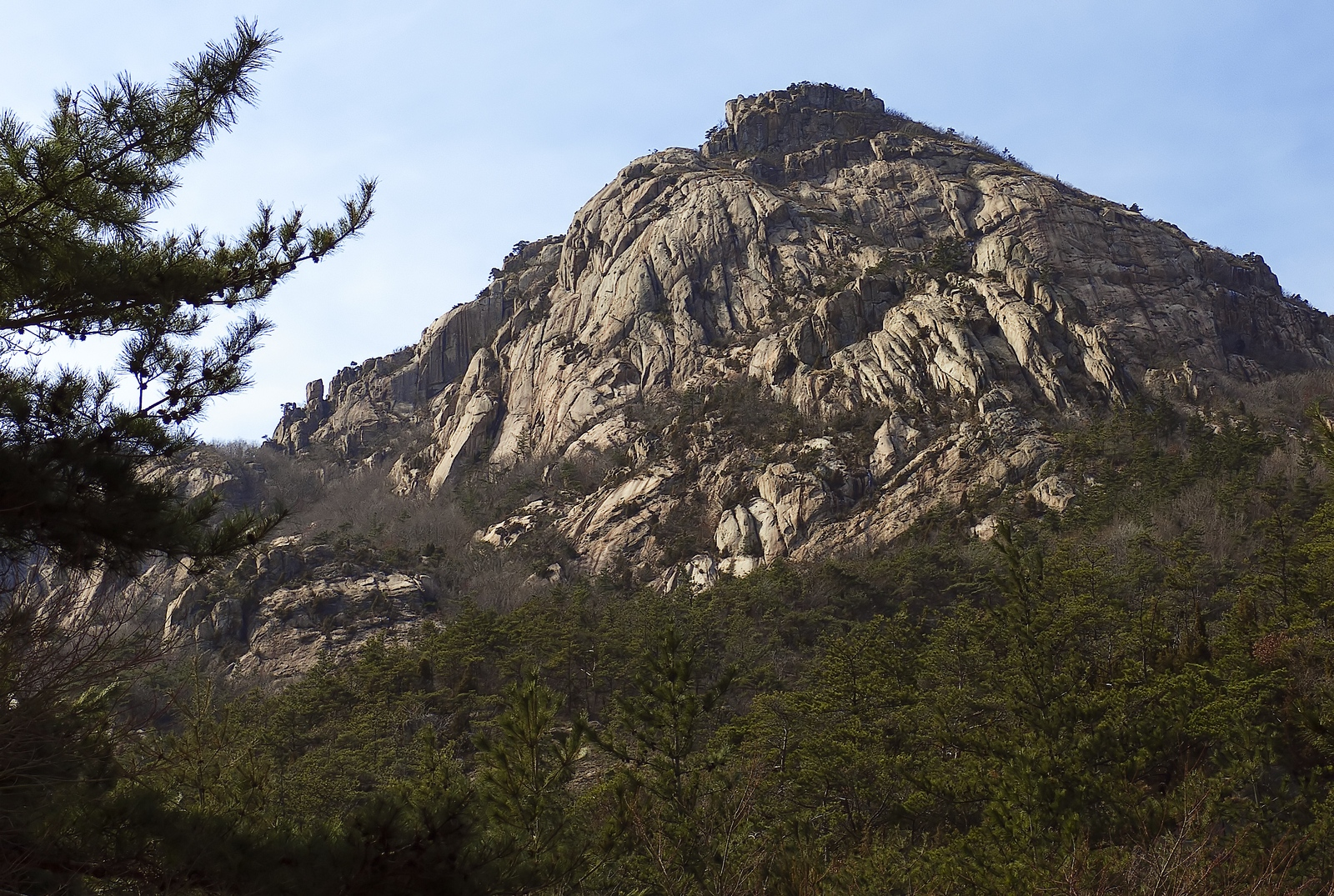
- View of the mountain Wolchulsan
- Interactive map of Wolchulsan National Park
- Location: Jeonnam-Gwangju, South Korea
- Coordinates: 34.744°N 126.675°E
- Area: 56.6 km^{2} (21.9 sq mi)
- Established: 11 June 1988
- Governing body: Korea National Park Service
- Website: english.knps.or.kr/Knp/Wolchulsan/Intro/Introduction.aspx

The twenty-two national parks of South Korea.
Land-based parks are in red and marine parks are in blue.

Wolchulsan National Park (Korean: 월출산국립공원; Hanja: 月出山國立公園) lies in Jeonnam-Gwangju, South Korea. Designated as a national park in 1988, Wolchulsan National Park is South Korea's smallest at only 56.6 km^{2} (21.9 sq mi).

The park takes its name from Wolchulsan, or Mt. Wolchul in Gangjin and Yeongam counties. The highest peak in the park is Cheong-hwang-bong, with an elevation of 809 m (2,654 ft). Also contained in the park are 3 national treasures and a number of local cultural properties.

Mt. Wolchul is nicknamed "Mount Kumgang of Honam" (Jeolla-do) or "Mount Kumgang of South Korea (Nam-han)" because of its breathtaking rocky landscape featuring rugged rocky peaks, deep valleys. Many says it has the best of what Korean mountains has to offer.

== Points of interest ==
- Dogapsa Temple (도갑사), South Korean National Treasure #50. The Buddhist temple has yet to be restored since it was burned down during the Korean War.
- Wolchulsan Seated Buddha, South Korean National Treasure #144, is an 8.6-metre-high statue (28 ft).
- Wolchulsan Sculpture Park, set on roughly 5,000 m^{2} (54,000 ft^{2}) of land.
- The "Cloud Bridge" (구름다리) is a 52-metre-long suspension bridge (171 ft) at a height of 120 metres (390 ft).
