= Korean Service Medal =

American service medal

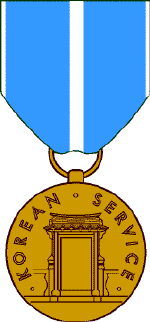
- Obverse
- Type: Military medal Service medal
- Awarded for: Service within territorial limits or service that directly supported the UN's military efforts in defense of South Korea between 1950 and 1954.
- Description: Obverse: On a bronze medal, 1-1/4 inch in diameter, a Korean gateway, encircled by the inscription "KOREAN SERVICE". Reverse: On the reverse is the Korean "taegeuk" symbol taken from the center of the South Korean national flag with the inscription "UNITED STATES OF AMERICA" and a spray of oak and laurel encircling the design. Ribbon: The ribbon is 1-3/8 inches wide and consists of the following stripes: 1/32 inch White; 19/32 inch Bluebird; center 1/8 inch White; 19/32 inch Bluebird; and 1/32 inch White
- Presented by: The US Department of Defense
- Eligibility: Military service during the Korean War
- Reverse
- Campaign: Korean War
- Status: Inactive
- Established: EO 10179, November 8, 1950, as amended
- First award: 1950 (retroactive to June 27, 1950)
- Final award: July 27, 1954
- Korean Service Medal ribbon & streamer

Precedence
- Next (higher): National Defense Service Medal
- Next (lower): Antarctica Service Medal
- Related: Korean War Service Medal (Korea); Korean Defense Service Medal; United Nations Korea Medal; National Defense Service Medal; Presidential Unit Citation (South Korea)

The Korean Service Medal (KSM) was a military award for service in the United States Armed Forces and was established November 8, 1950, by executive order of President Harry Truman. The Korean Service Medal is the primary US military award for service or participation in operations in the Korean area during the Korean War between June 27, 1950, and July 27, 1954.

== Medal devices ==
=== Service stars ===
The United States Department of Defense declared thirteen official campaigns of the Korean War, all of which are annotated by service stars on the Korean Service Medal. Some campaigns apply to all branches of the US military, while others are branch specific. The Korean Service Medal is authorized a 3/16" bronze or silver (indicates five campaigns) service star to denote participation in any of the following campaigns:

- North Korean Aggression (USMC, Navy): June 27 to November 2, 1950
- United Nations Defensive (Army, USAF): June 27 to September 15, 1950
- Inchon Landing (USMC, Navy): September 13 to 17, 1950
- United Nations Offensive (Army, USAF): September 16 to November 2, 1950
- Chinese Communist Forces Intervention (Army, USAF): November 3, 1950, to January 24, 1951
- Communist China Aggression (USMC, Navy): November 3, 1950, to January 24, 1951
- First United Nations Counteroffensive (USMC, Army, Navy, USAF): January 25 to April 21, 1951
- Chinese Communist Forces Spring Offensive (USMC, Army, Navy, USAF): April 22 to July 8, 1951
- United Nations Summer-Fall Offensive (USMC, Army, Navy, USAF): July 9 to November 27, 1951
- Second Korean Winter (USMC, Army, Navy, USAF): November 28, 1951, to April 30, 1952
- Korean Defense Summer-Fall, 1952 (USMC, Army, Navy, USAF): May 1 to November 30, 1952
- Third Korean Winter (USMC, Army, Navy, USAF): December 1, 1952, to April 30, 1953
- Korea, Summer 1953 (USMC, Army, Navy, USAF): May 1 to July 27, 1953

=== Arrowhead device ===
An arrowhead device is authorized for US Army or Air Force personnel to denote participation in each of the following:

- Amphibious landing at Inchon
- Airborne attacks on Sukch'on-Such'on and Munsan-Ni

=== Fleet Marine Force combat operation insignia ===
- The Fleet Marine Force Combat Operation Insignia is authorized for US Navy personnel who served with the Marine Corps at any time during the Korean War.

== History ==
Although the Korean War Armistice ended combat operations in Korea on 27 July 1953, the Korean Service Medal was issued until June 1954 due to the tense nature of the occupation and garrison duty immediately after the armistice, as well as the high possibility of a renewed attack by North Korea. After 1954, the Korean Service Medal was no longer issued although the Armed Forces Expeditionary Medal was authorized for Korean area service between October 1, 1966, to June 30, 1974. As of 2004, a new medal known as the Korea Defense Service Medal was authorized for members of the armed forces who served in the defense of the Republic of Korea from July 28, 1954, to a date to be determined.

The KSM was designed by the Army Heraldic Section. The color scheme of the ribbon is derived from the Flag of the United Nations, as it was under the auspices of the United Nations (United Nations Security Council Resolution 82) that the war was conducted. The medal itself features a "Korean gateway," most likely an iljumun, on the front, and a taegeuk on the reverse.

The United Nations Service Medal for Korea was usually issued alongside the Korean Service Medal. Beginning in 1999, the Republic of Korea War Service Medal was also awarded to United States service members who received the Korean Service Medal. The Republic of Korea Presidential Unit Citation is retroactively authorized to any United States Army veteran who served in Korea during the War.
