= Iljumun =

Entrance gate of Korean Buddhist temples

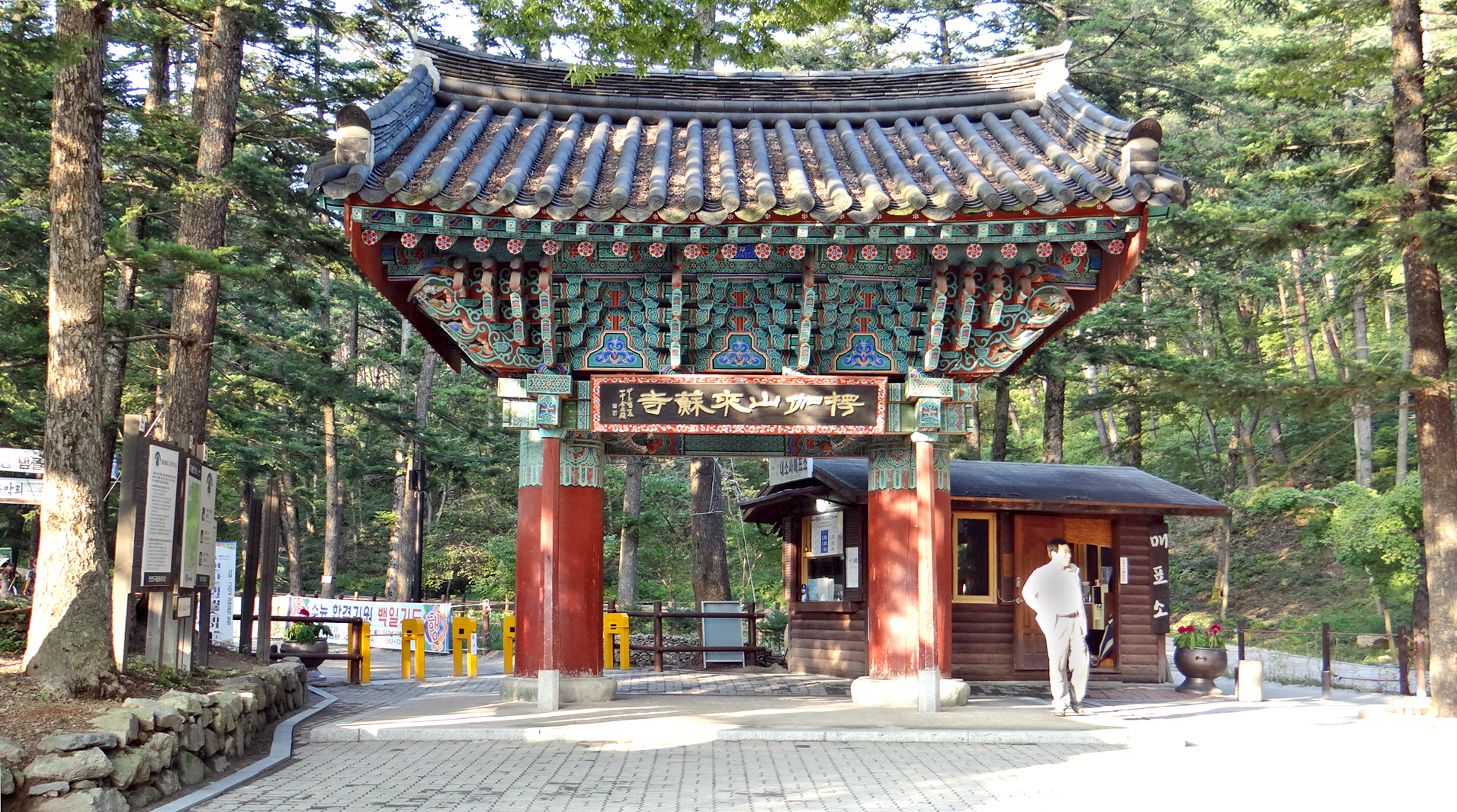
- The iljumun of Naesosa Temple, Buan County

Korean name
- Hangul: 일주문
- Hanja: 一柱門
- RR: iljumun
- MR: ilchumun

Iljumun (Korean: 일주문; Hanja: 一柱門; lit. 'One-pillar gate') is the first gate of Korean Buddhist temples. Its name originated from the pillars being in one line. A tablet with the temple's name is usually installed on the gate.

== Description ==
Iljumun is one of the three major types of gates constructed on the path that leads to the temple and often illustrates the formality of Buddhist architecture. The other two are the sacheonwangmun (사천왕문; 四天王門) and burimun (불이문; 不二門). The three gates are sometimes referred to as sanmun (산문; 山門).

Physically, the gate serves to demarcate the temple from the outside. It symbolizes purification and one must leave all of their worldly desires before entering the temple. The oneness is also a metaphor for non-duality (unity) in spirit and heart.

Iljumun is said to have originated from the tradition of placing four gates at the four cardinal points around the stupas of Sanchi in India since the 1st century BC.

== In culture ==
An image of an Iljumun appears on the obverse of the Korean Service Medal.

== See also ==
- Hongsalmun in Korean architecture
- Torana in Hindu-Buddhist Indian-origin
- Torii in Japanese temple architecture
- Paifang and Shanmen in Chinese temple architecture
- Tam quan in Vietnamese temple architecture
