= Wolchulsan =

Mountain in South Korea

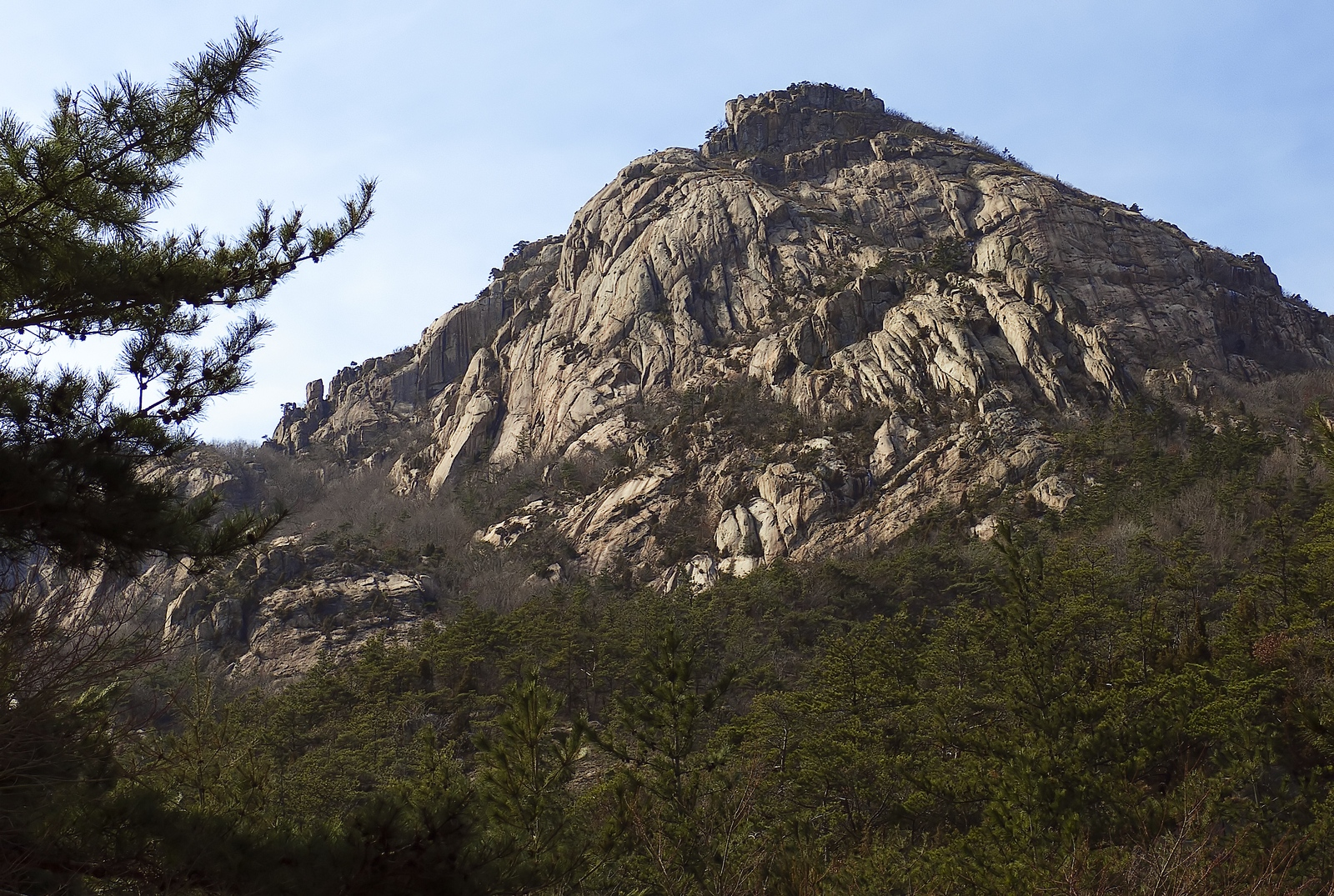
- Wolchulsan mountain peak

Highest point
- Coordinates: 34°46′04″N 126°42′16″E

Dimensions
- Width: 0.053 km (0.033 mi)
- Area: 42 km^{2} (16 mi^{2})

Naming
- Etymology: Moon rising mountain
- Nickname: Mount Kumgang of Honam

Geography
- Location: Yeongam and Gangjin counties
- Country: South Korea
- Region: Honam
- Range coordinates: 34°46′4″N 126°42′16″E
- Biome: Warm-temperate forest and subtropical forest ecosystems

Climbing
- Normal route: Cheonhwangsa Loop
- Access: Challenging, rock climbing

Wolchulsan (Korean: 월출산) is a mountain located in South Jeolla Province, South Korea; and spans both Gangjin and Yeongam counties. At its peak, Cheonhwangbong, it rises to 808.7 meters, making it the highest point in Gangjin County.

It lies in a national park of the same name. Wolchulsan National Park is the smallest national park of South Korea, with an area of 41 square kilometres (16 sq mi). A notable feature of the mountain is the "Cloud Bridge" (구름다리) a small suspension bridge that spans two peaks.

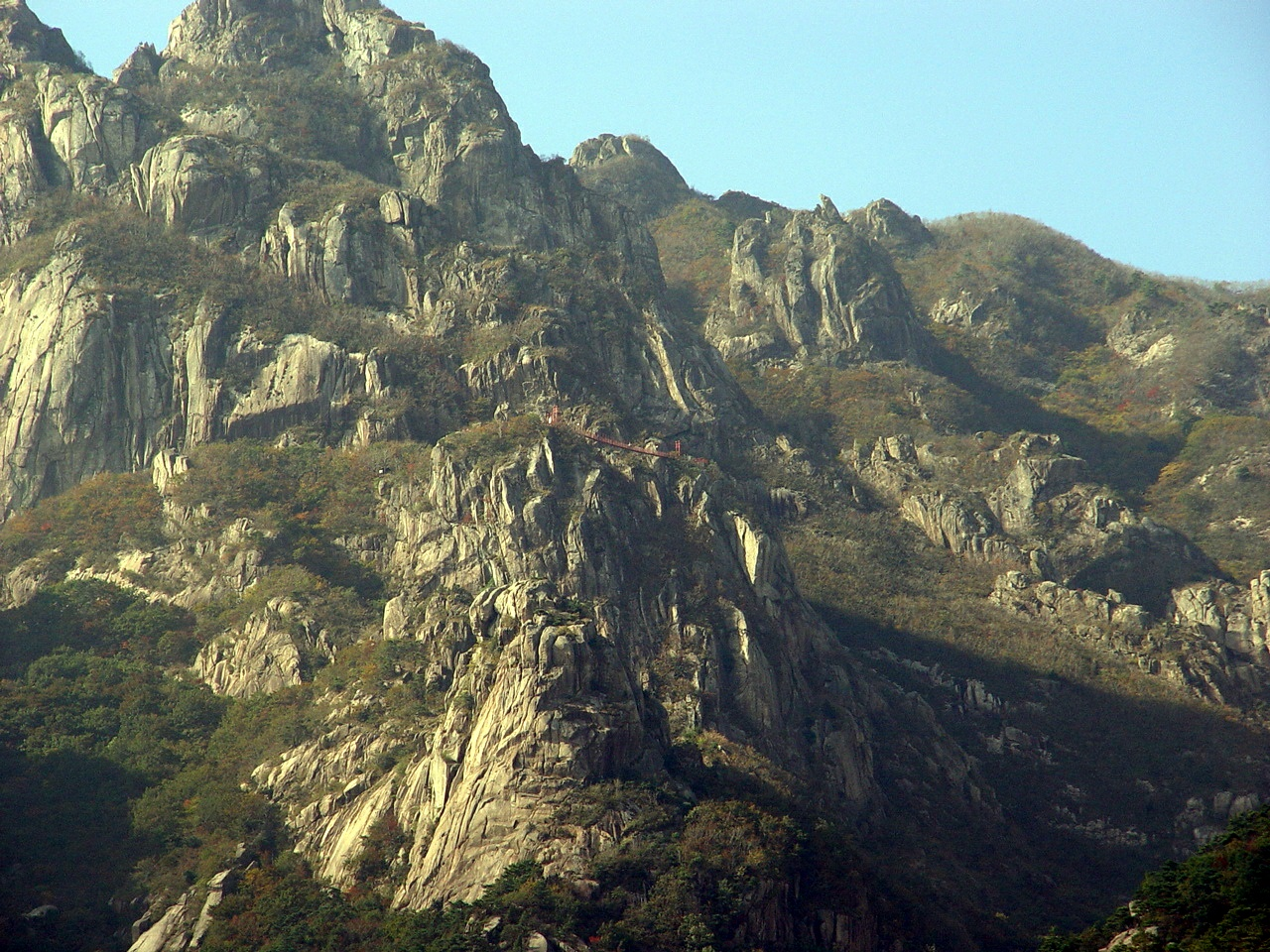
Wolchulsan and its "Cloud Bridge"

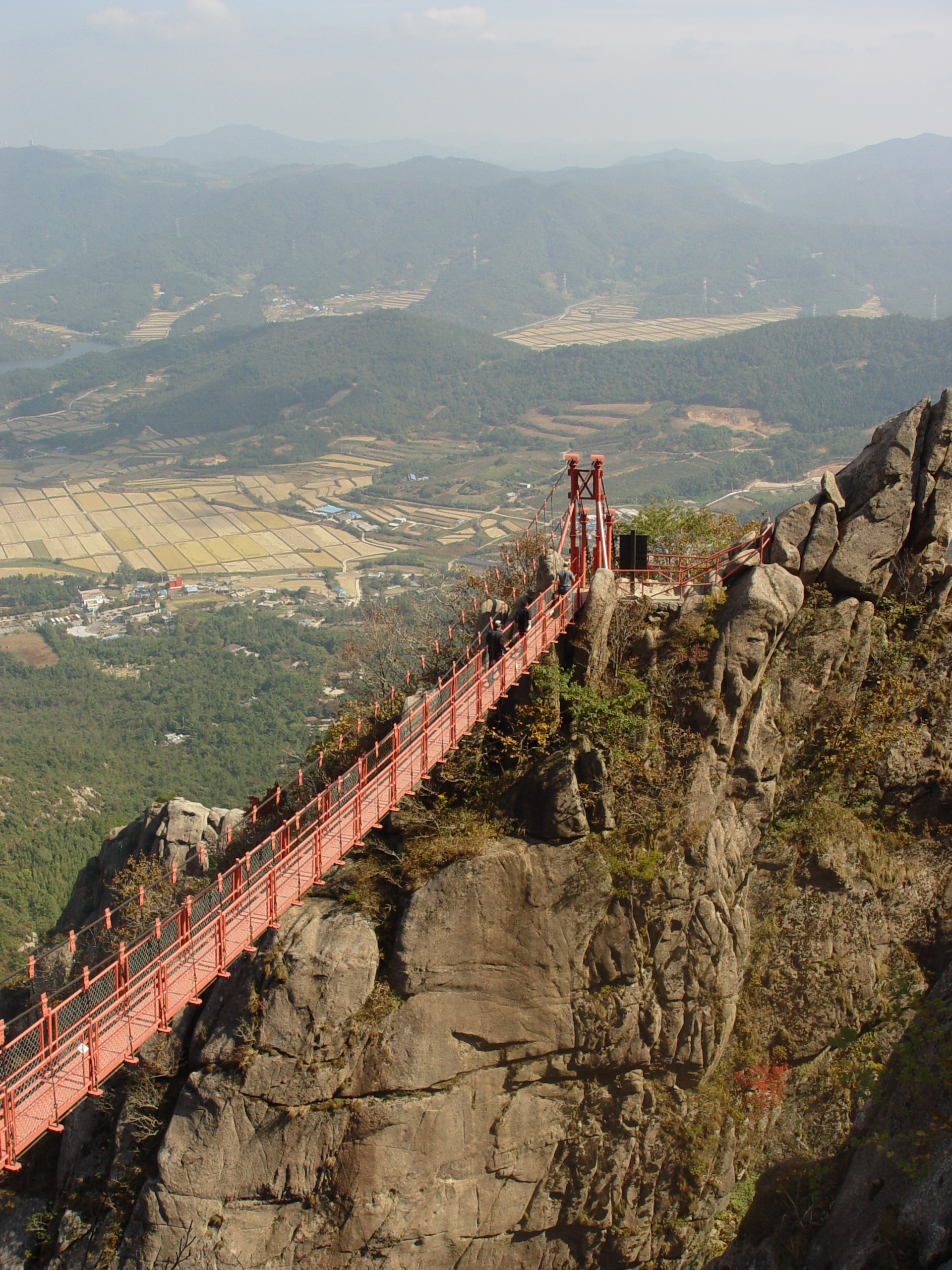
Cloud Bridge

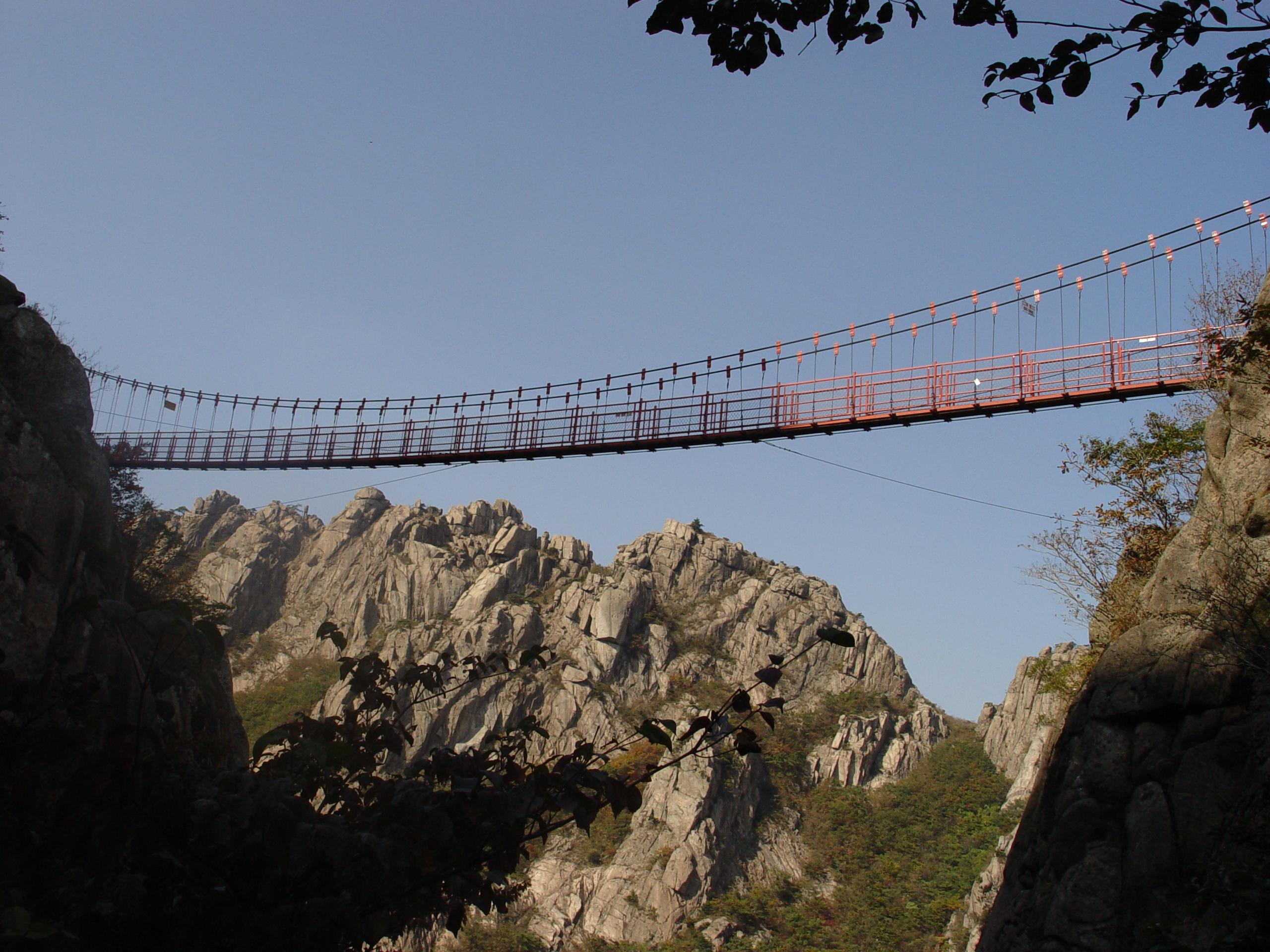
Cloud Bridge
