= Hall of Four Heavenly Kings =

First important hall inside Chinese, Korean and Japanese Ōbaku Zen Buddhist temples

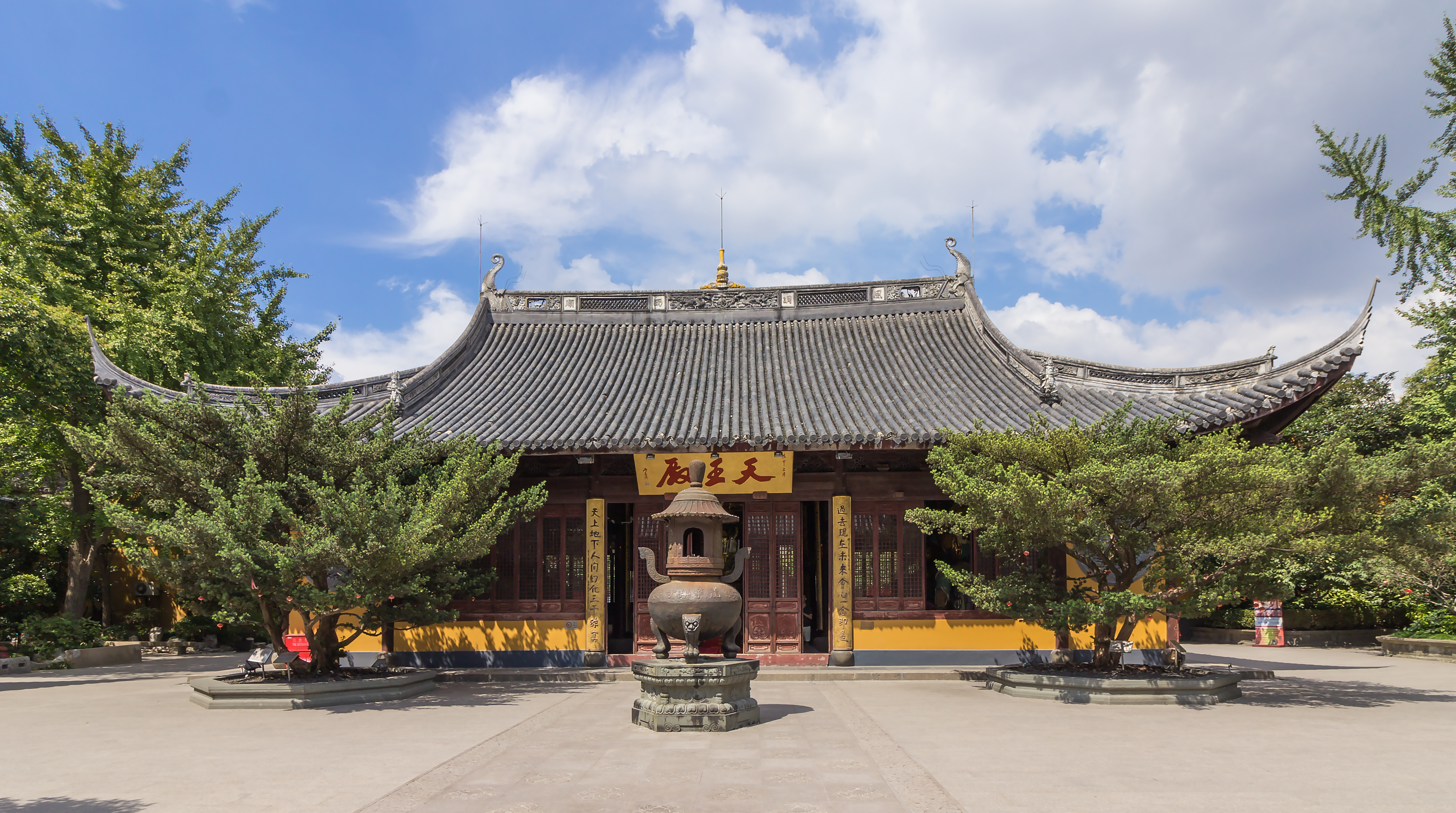
- The Four Heavenly Kings Hall of Longhua Temple, Shanghai, China

Chinese name
- Chinese: 天王殿
- Literal meaning: Hall of the Heavenly Kings
Transcriptions
Standard Mandarin
- Hanyu Pinyin: Tiānwángdiàn

Vietnamese name
- Vietnamese alphabet: Thiên Vương Điện
- Chữ Hán: 天王殿

Korean name
- Hangul: 천왕문
- Hanja: 天王門
- Literal meaning: Gate of the Heavenly Kings
Transcriptions
- Revised Romanization: Cheonwangmun

Japanese name
- Kanji: 天王殿
Transcriptions
- Romanization: Tennōden

The Hall of Four Heavenly Kings is a building in East Asian Buddhist temples. It is the first important hall inside a shanmen (mount gate) in most Chinese and Japanese temples. In Korean temples, it is the second gate leading to the temple, the first gate being iljumun. It is typically named due to the Four Heavenly Kings statues enshrined in the hall. It is usually called Tianwangdian in China, Tennōden in Japan, and Sacheonwangmun or Cheonwangmun in Korea.

== China ==
Traditionally, the Hall of Four Heavenly Kings is built with the entrance facing north, and located before the Mahavira Hall. In the typical layout of a Hall of Four Heavenly Kings, the historical monk Budai, commonly regarded as an emanation of Maitreya Buddha, is enshrined at the front entry of the Hall of Four Heavenly Kings, with a statue of Skanda Bodhisattva behind him facing the back entry. Statues of the Four Heavenly Kings are usually enshrined at the four corners of the hall.

In Buddhism, the Maitreya Buddha, also the future Buddha is Sakyamuni's successor. In the history of Chinese Buddhism, Maitreya Buddha has the handsome image in which he wears a coronet on his head and yingluo (瓔珞) on his body and his hands pose in mudras. According to Song-dynasty Biographies of Eminent Monks (《宋高僧傳》; Sung kao-seng chuan), in the Later Liang Dynasty (907–923), Budai was a big-stomached monk named "Qici" (契此和尚) in Fenghua of Mingzhou (now Zhejiang). Carrying a sack on his shoulder, he always begged in the markets and streets, laughing. So local people called him "The Sack Monk" (布袋和尚). When he reached his Parinirvana, he left a Buddhist Gatha: "Maitreya, the true Maitreya, has thousands of hundreds of millions of manifestations, often instructing people of their time, even when they themselves do not recognize him." (彌勒真彌勒，分身百千億，時時示世人，世人總不識。) So he was seen as the manifestation of Maitreya Buddha. Since then, in Chinese Buddhist temples, Maitreya statues were shaped into a big fat monk's image with a big head and ears, laughing with his upper body exposed and cross-legged.

Skanda Bodhisattva is the dharmapala in charge of protecting Buddhist temples and scriptures. His image is typically depicted as a handsome ancient Chinese general who wearing armors, and wielding a vajra pestle. A few common poses he is depicted in include holding up the vajra pestle and leaning it on his shoulder with one hand while the other hand is held up in a mudra, leaning one end of the vajra pestle on the ground and gripping the other end with one hand while the other hand rests at his waist, and clasping both his hands together in a gesture of respect before his chest while the vajra pestle rests horizontally across his arms.

The statues of the Four Heavenly Kings are enshrined around the four corners on the left and right sides of the Hall of Four Heavenly Kings. There are the eastern Dhṛtarāṣṭra (持國天王; Dhṛtarāṣṭra wears white clothes and armor and has a pipa, a Chinese plucked string musical instrument, in his hand), the southern Virūḍhaka (增長天王; Virūḍhaka wears blue clothes with a sword in his hand), the western Virūpākṣa (廣目天王; Virūpākṣa wears red clothes with a dragon or a snake wrapped around his arm), and the northern Vaiśravaṇa (多聞天王; Vaiśravaṇa wears green clothes with a precious umbrella in his right hand and a silver sacred mouse in his left hand). The Four Heavenly Kings are said to live in Mount Meru and their task is to protect the world in their direction respectively.

== Japan ==
In Japan, Four Heavenly Kings Hall is exemplified at Manpuku-ji, the head temple of the Ōbaku Zen sect in Uji, Kyoto. Founded in 1661 by the Chinese monk Yinyuan Longqi (Ingen Ryūki), Manpuku-ji is renowned for its strict adherence to Ming dynasty Chinese architecture and rituals . The temple complex follows a symmetrical axial layout, with the Four Heavenly Kings Hall positioned between the Sanmon and the Mahavira Hall. The Four Heavenly Kings Hall features a hip-and-gable roof with ornate carvings, including peach-shaped door panels believed to ward off evil. Its design incorporates elements like "×"-shaped railings, reflecting Ming-era Yingzao Fashi standards. In 2024, the Four Heavenly Kings Hall, alongside the Mahavira Hall and Dharma Hall, was designated a Japanese National Treasure for its preservation of original construction. It enshrines a central statue of laughing Maitreya Buddha, crafted by the Chinese sculptor Fan Daosheng. Flanking him are the Four Heavenly Kings. It represents the transplantation of Chinese Chan Buddhism during Japan's Edo period.

== Korea ==
In Korea, sacheonwangmun (사천왕문) or cheonwangmun (천왕문) is the second gate of the three gates leading to the temple, the first gate being iljumun and the third gate being burimun. The gate is constructed to protect the temple and make visitors have the idea that all evil spirits have been eliminated by these gods. It also implies that the visitor reached Mount Meru after passing iljumun.

The features of the Four Heavenly Kings differ by period. In Unified Silla, they were armed with swords and spears. Geumgang yeoksa is sometimes drawn on cheonwangmun.

It was originally a building but turned into a gate during the Goryeo dynasty. When there was a national crisis, Goryeo kings installed sacheonwangmun and prayed for the overcoming.

== Vietnam ==
In Vietnam, Four Heavenly Kings Hall is integrated into temples like Thiên Mụ Pagoda in Huế, founded in 1601 by Nguyễn Lord Nguyễn Hoàng. The temple complex combines Chinese palace-style architecture with local elements, featuring hip-and-gable roofs, courtyards, and an iconic octagonal tower which called Phước Duyên Tower. It often houses Maitreya and the Four Heavenly Kings, while the Mahavira Hall enshrines the Three Saints of the West.

== Examples ==
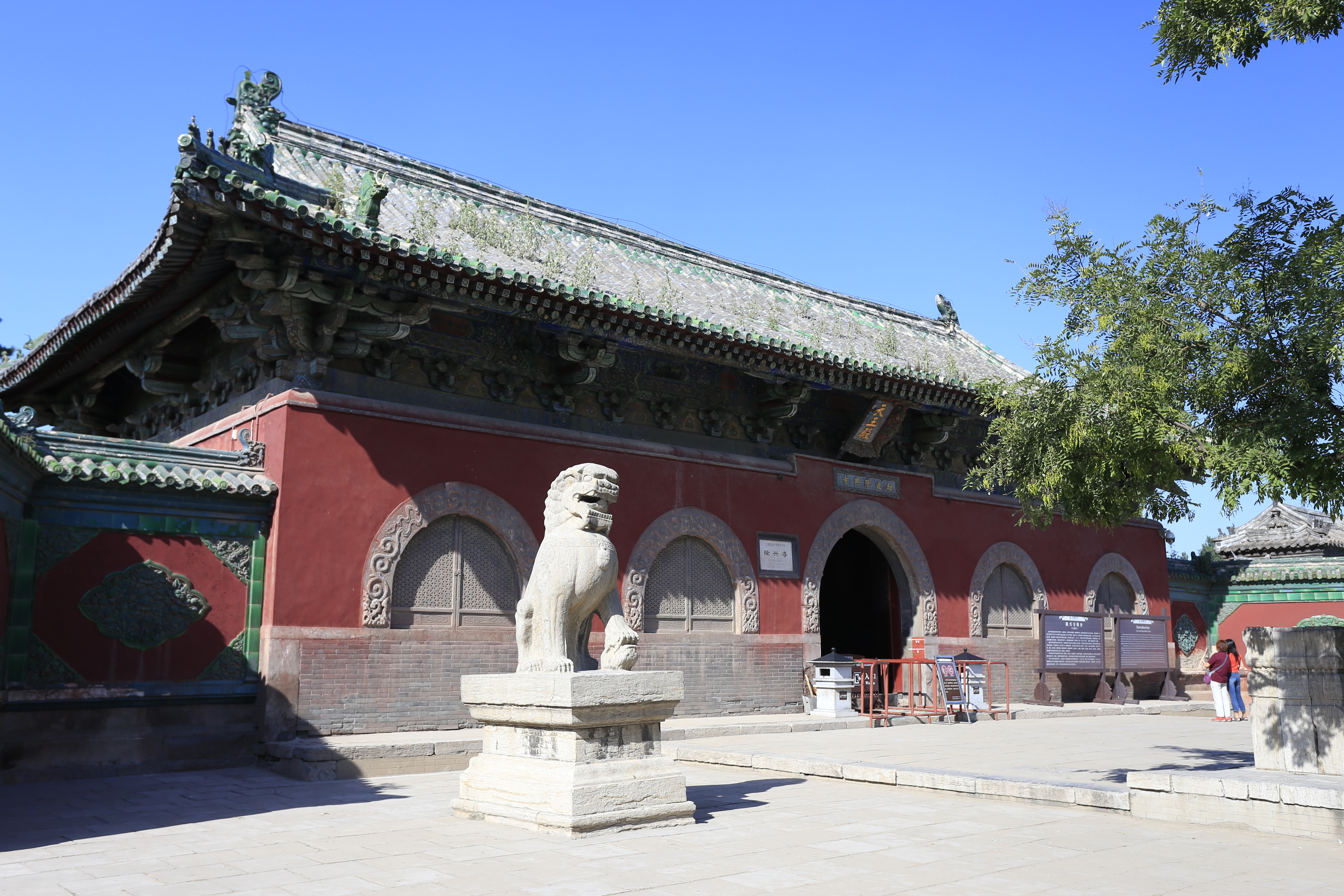
Song dynasty (960–1279) Tianwang dian of Longxing Temple in Zhengding, Hebei, China.

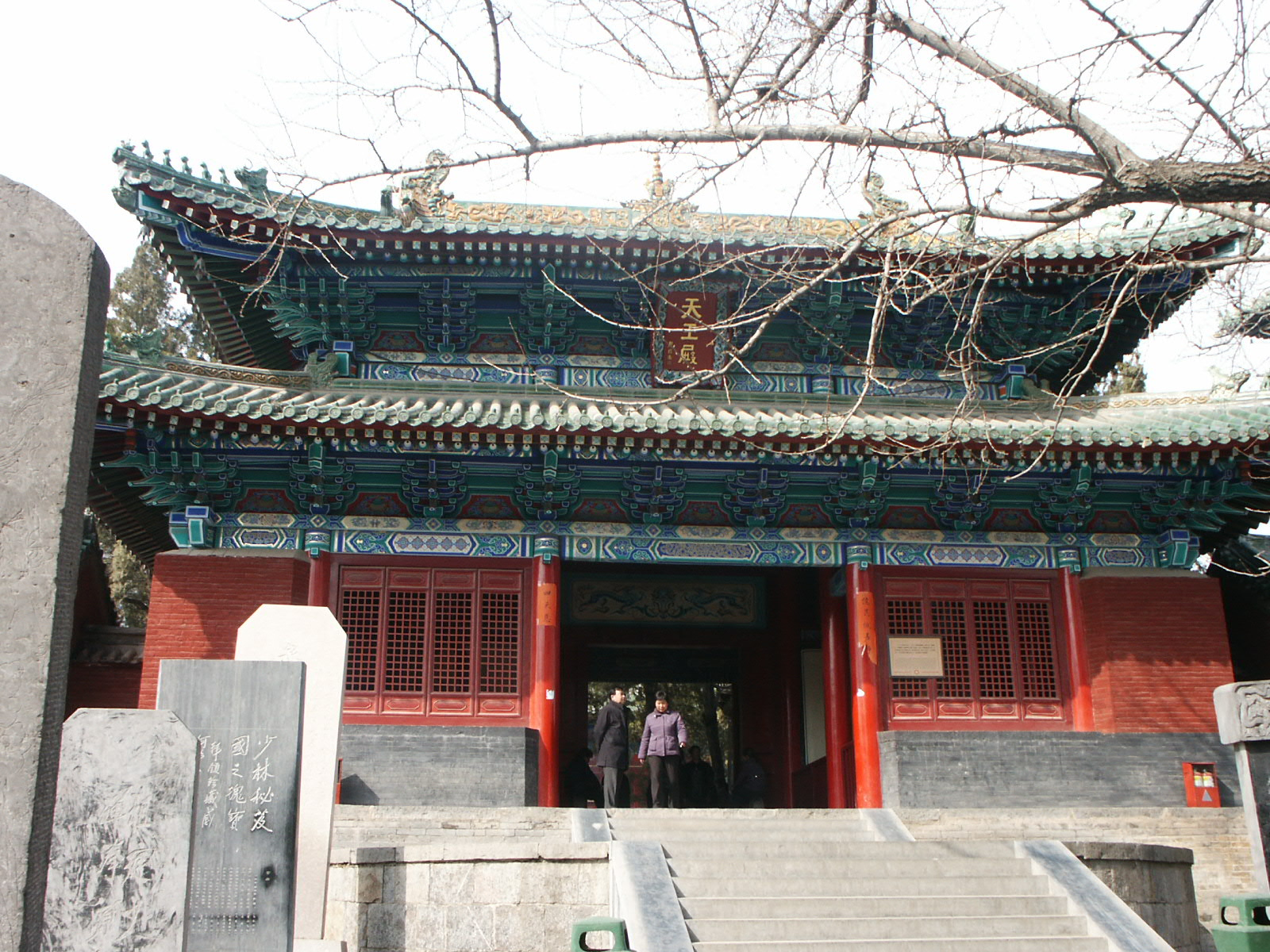
Yuan dynasty (1271–1368) Tianwang dian of Shaolin Temple in Dengfeng, Henan, China.

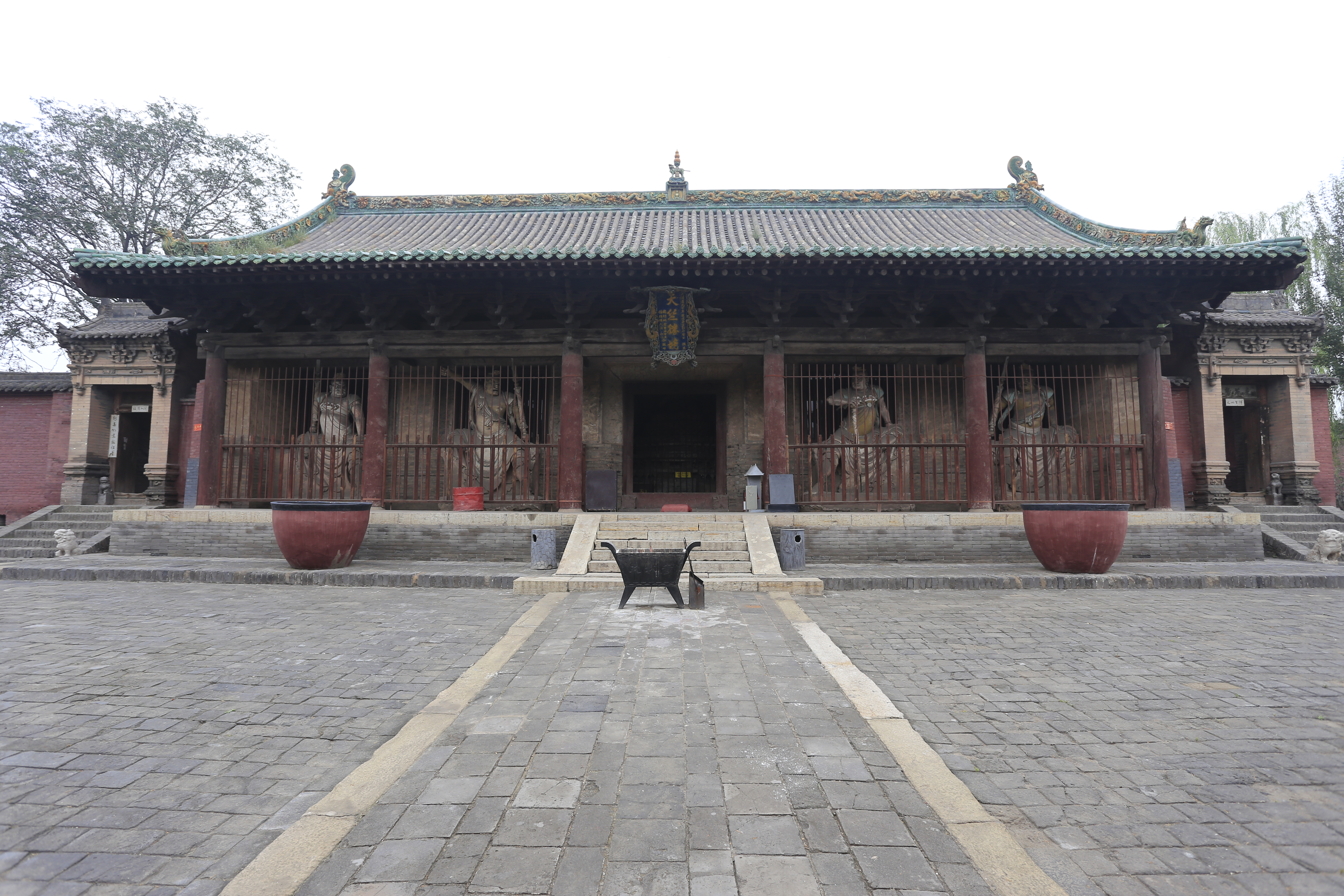
Ming dynasty (1368–1644) Tianwang dian of Shuanglin Temple in Pingyao, Shanxi, China.

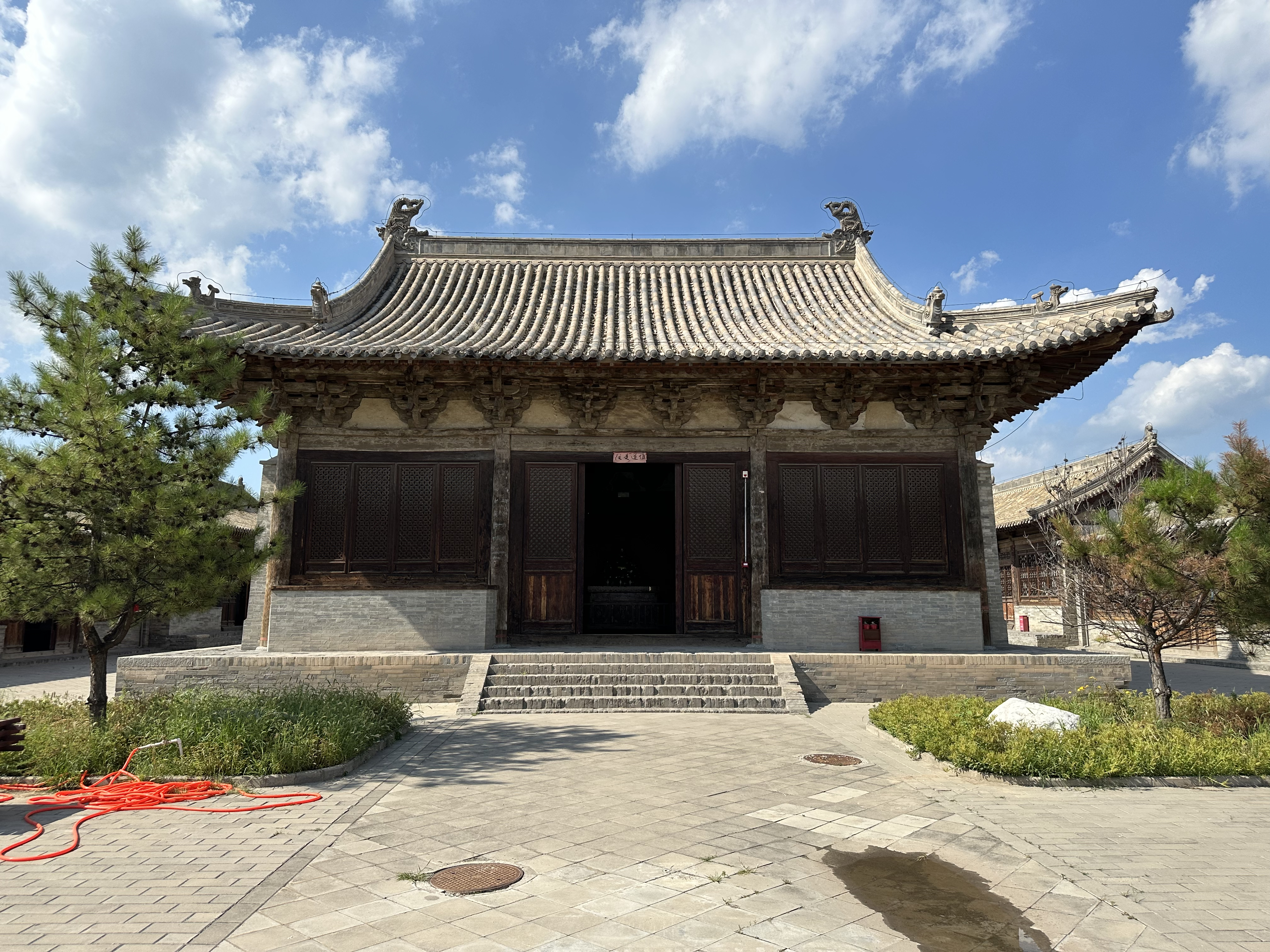
Ming dynasty (1368–1644) Tainwang dian of Lingyan Temple in Zhangjiakou, Hebei, China. Built in 1441.

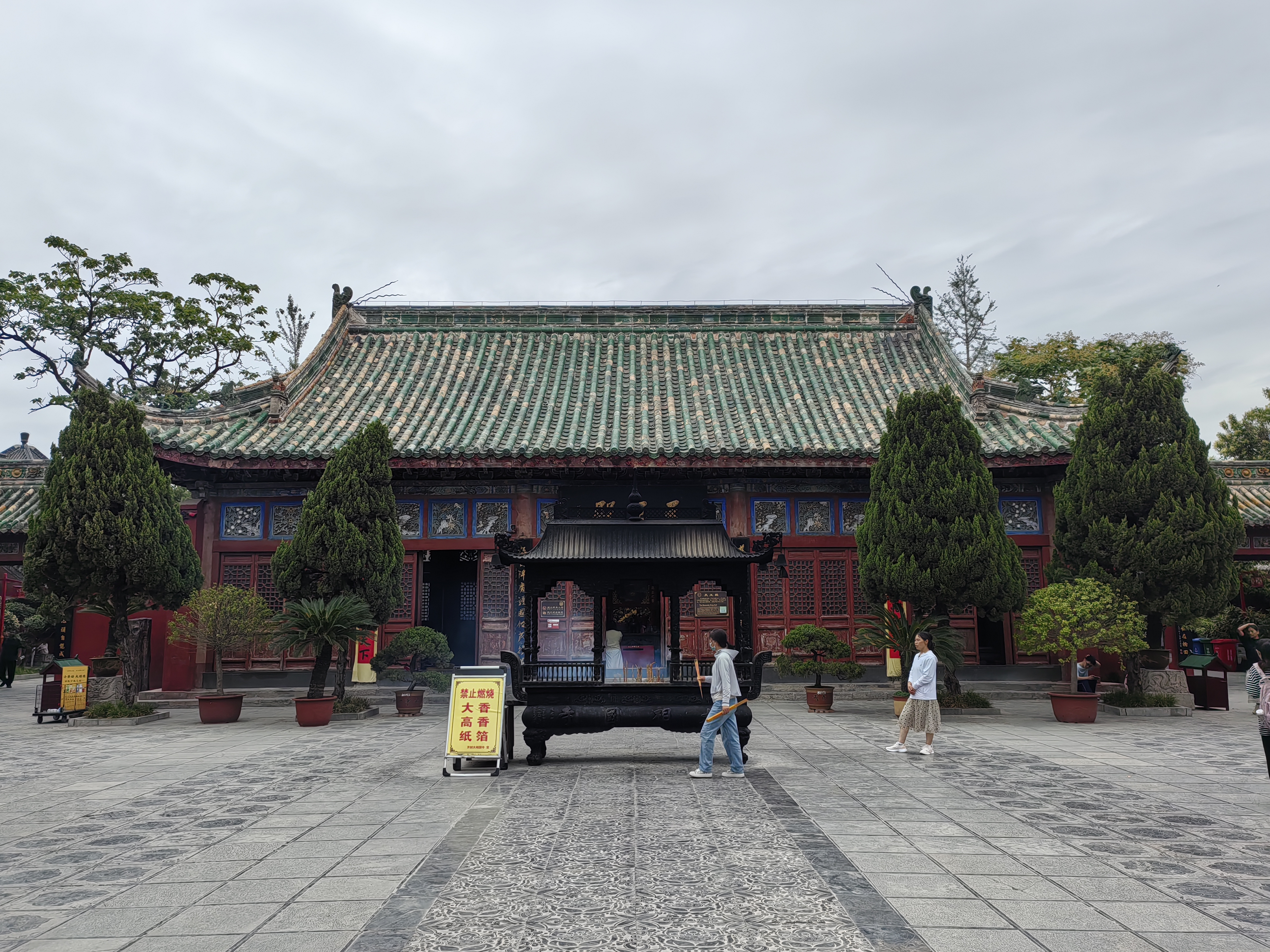
Early Qing dynasty (1644–1912) Tianwang dian of Daxiangguo Temple in Kaifeng, Henan, China. Built in 1661.

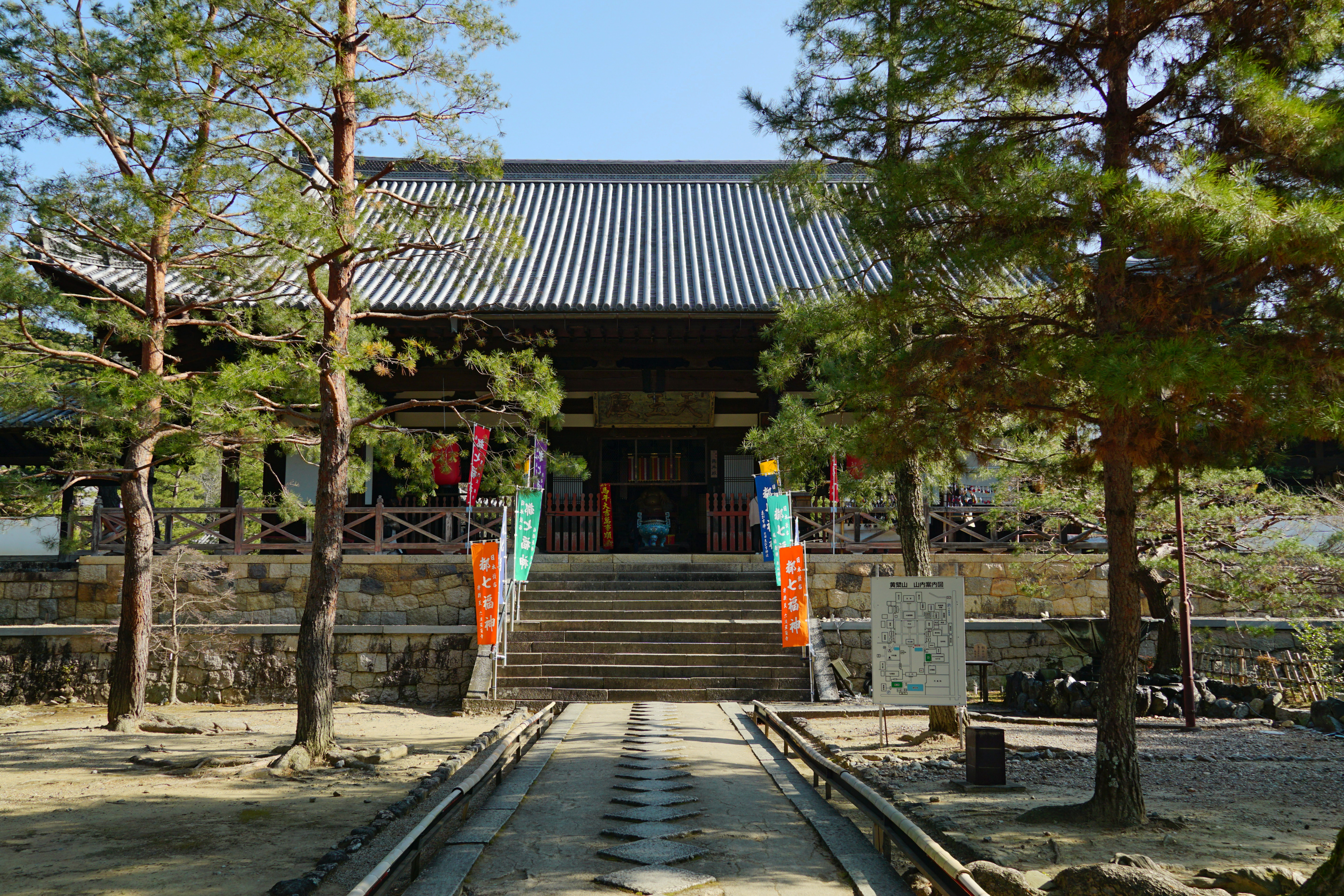
Early Edo period (1600–1868) Tennō-den of Manpuku-ji in Uji, Kyoto, Japan. Built in 1668.

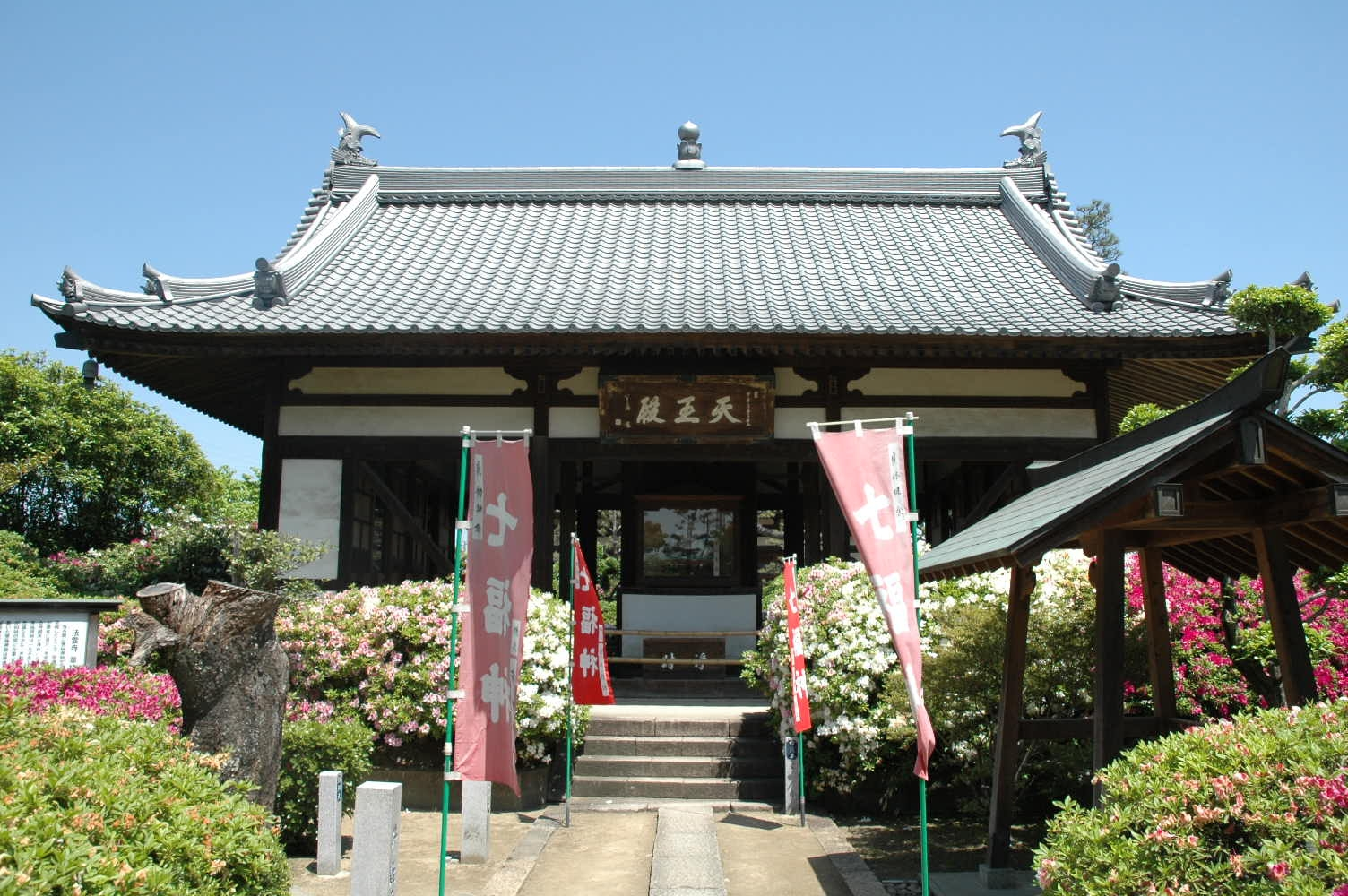
Edo period (1600–1868) Tennō-den of Hōun-ji in Sakai, Osaka, Japan. Built in 1704. It enshrines a statue of Bodhidharma instead of Skanda.

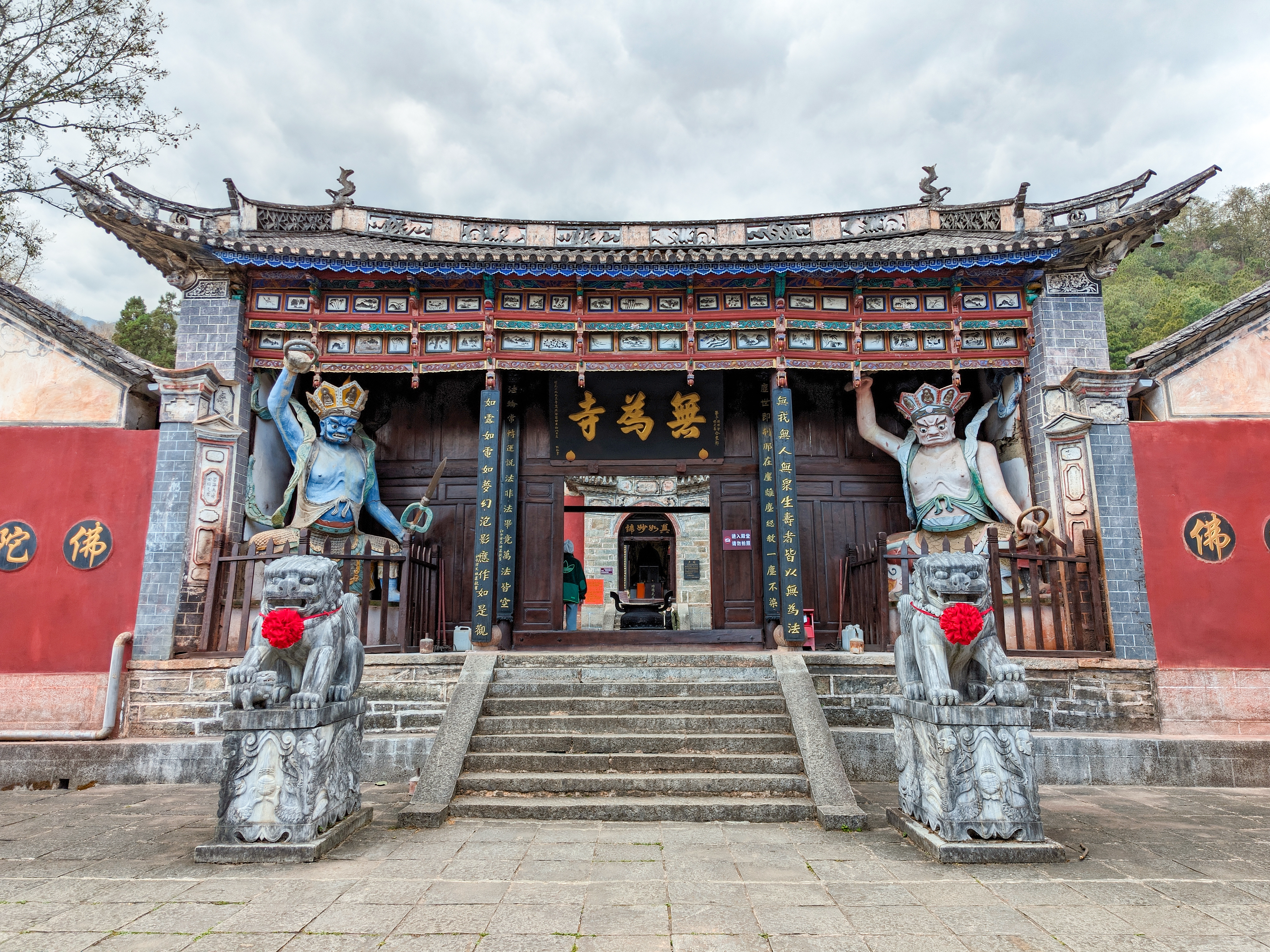
Qing dynasty (1644–1912) Tianwang dian of Wuwei Temple in Dali, Yunnan, China.

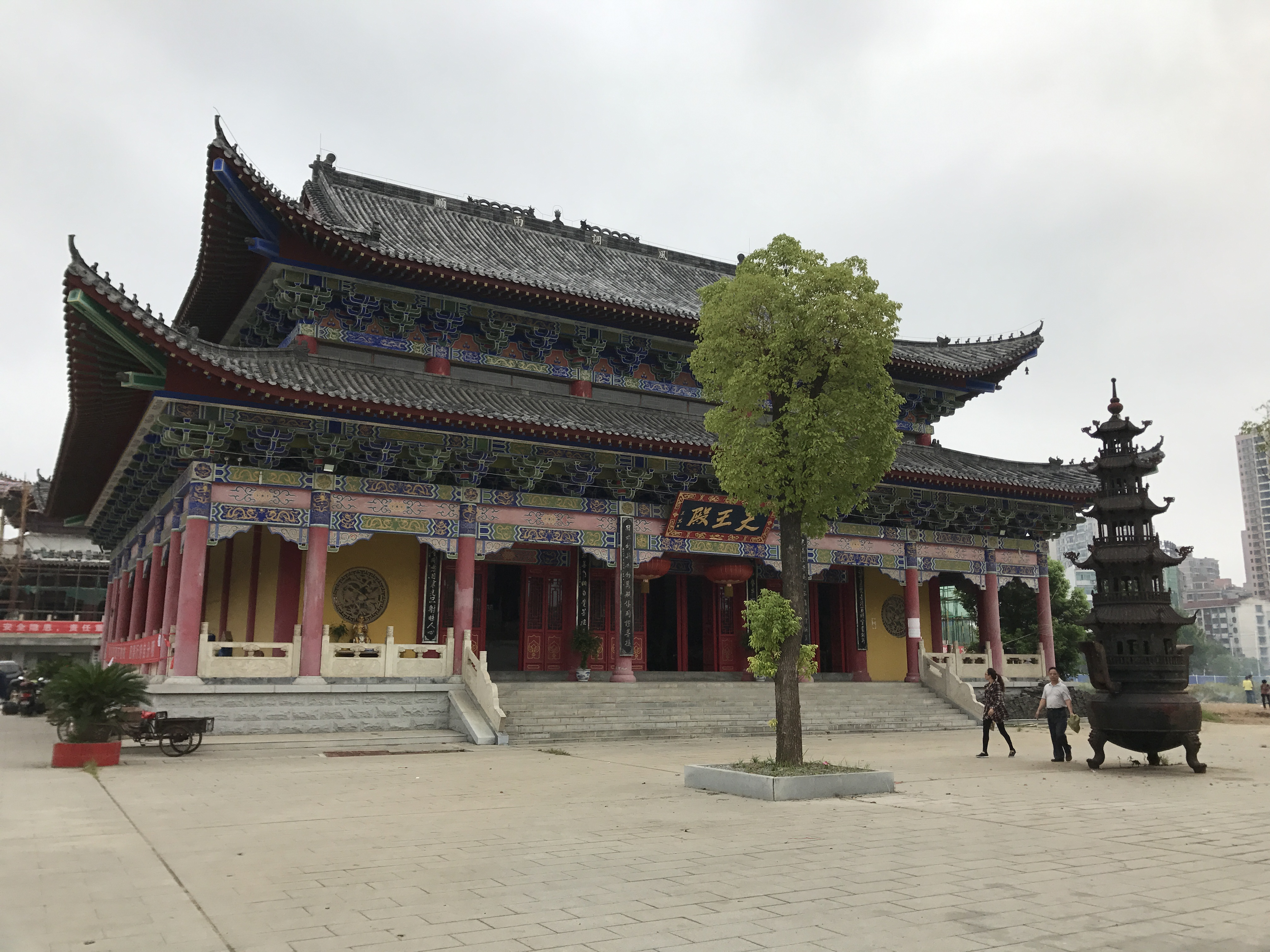
Late Qing dynasty (1644–1912) Tianwang dian of Anguo Temple in Huangguang, Hubei, China. Rebuilt in 1864.

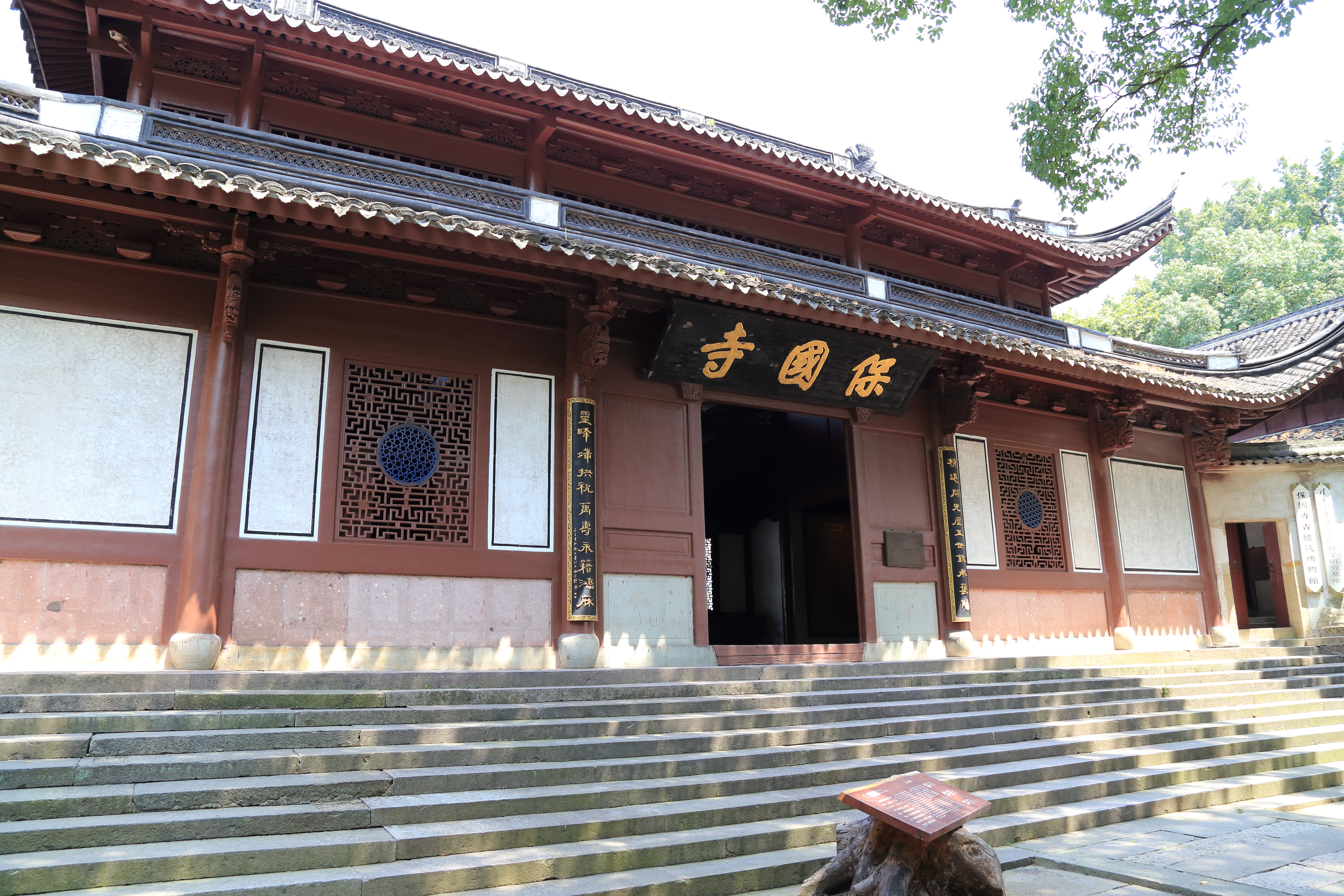
Late Qing dynasty (1644–1912) Tianwang dian of Baoguo Temple in Ningbo, Zhejiang, China. Rebuilt in 1911.

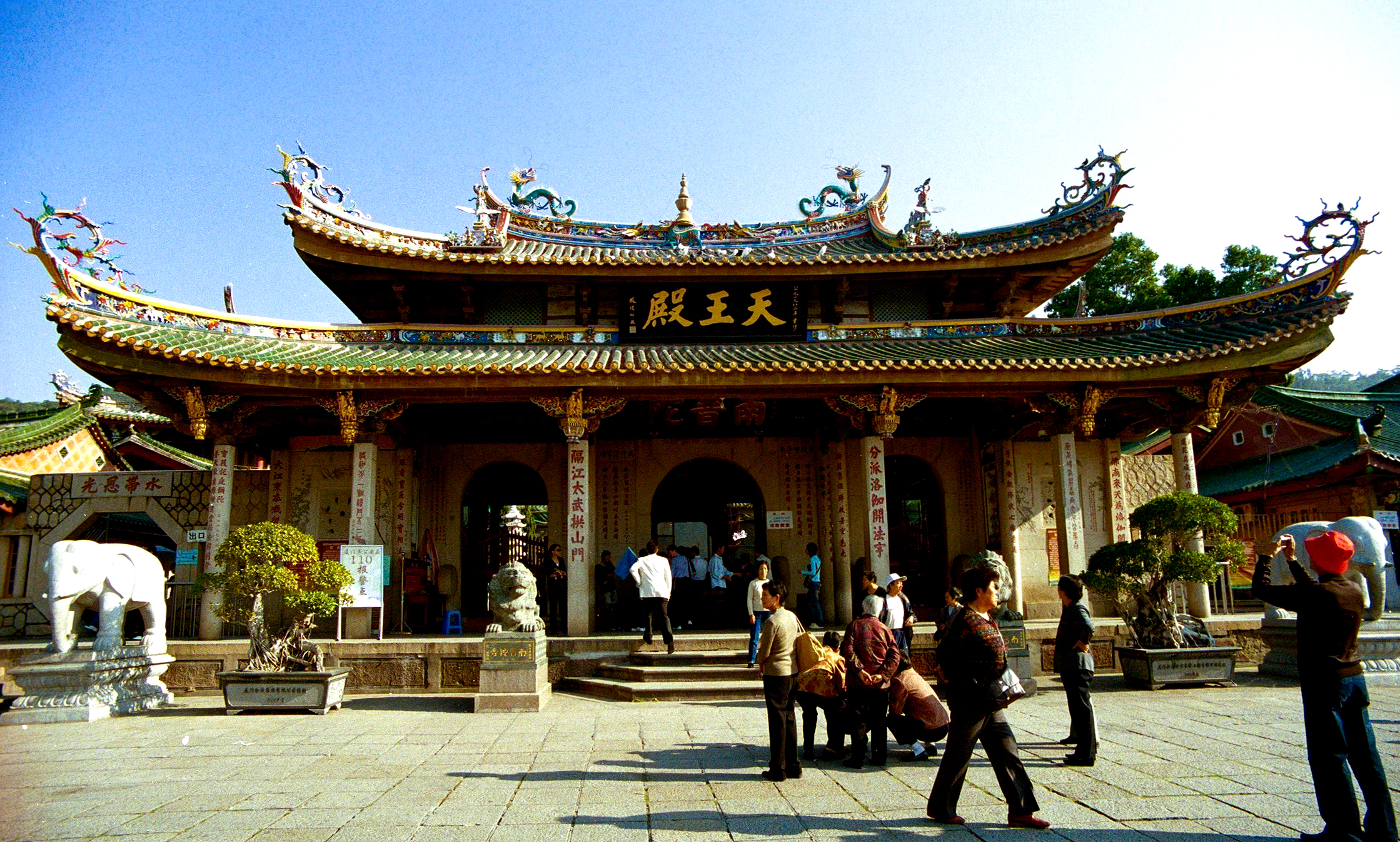
Tianwang dian of Nanputuo Temple in Xiamen, Fujian, China. Rebuilt in 1925.

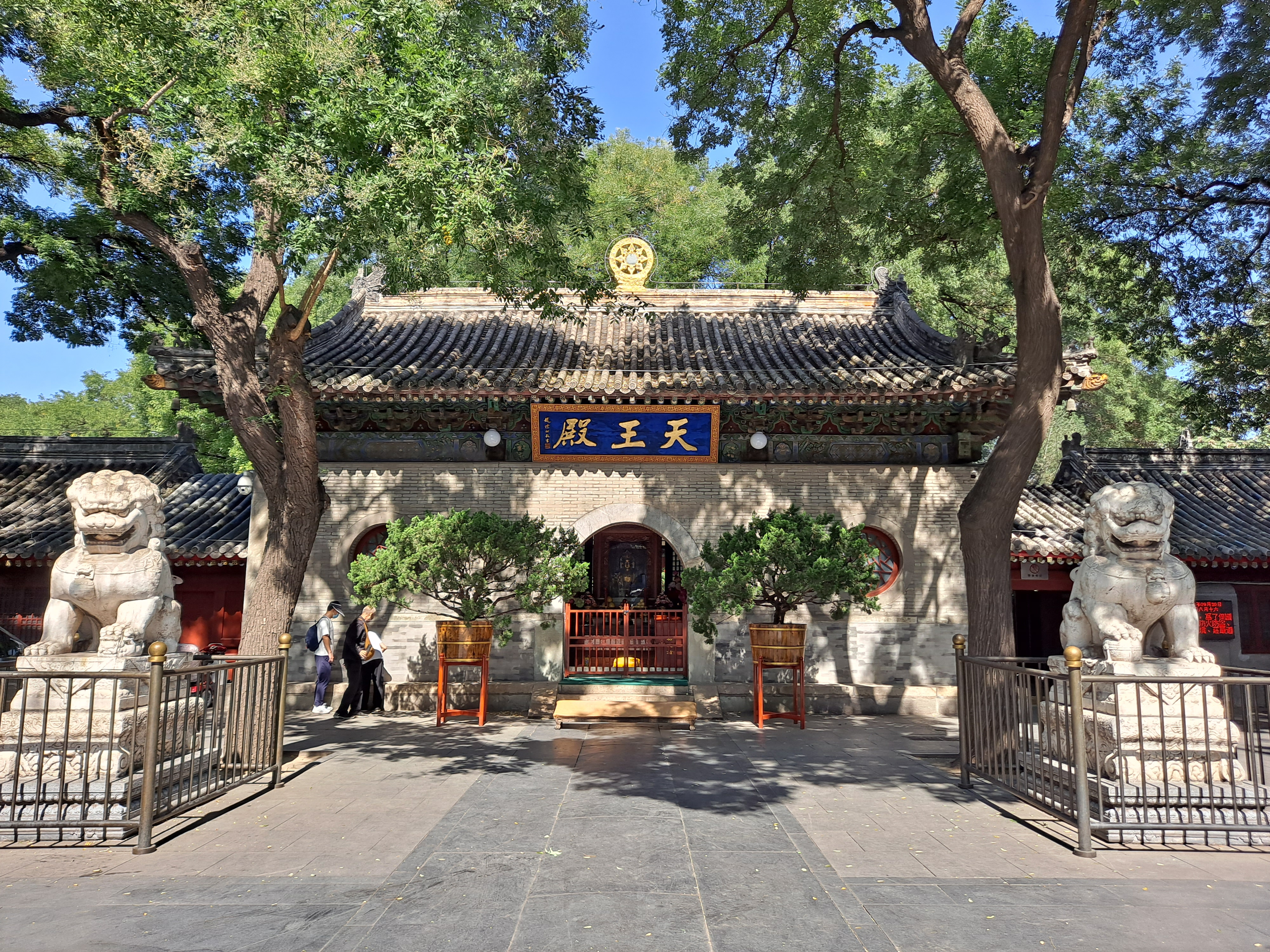
Tianwang dian of Guangji Temple in Beijing, China. Rebuilt in 1935.

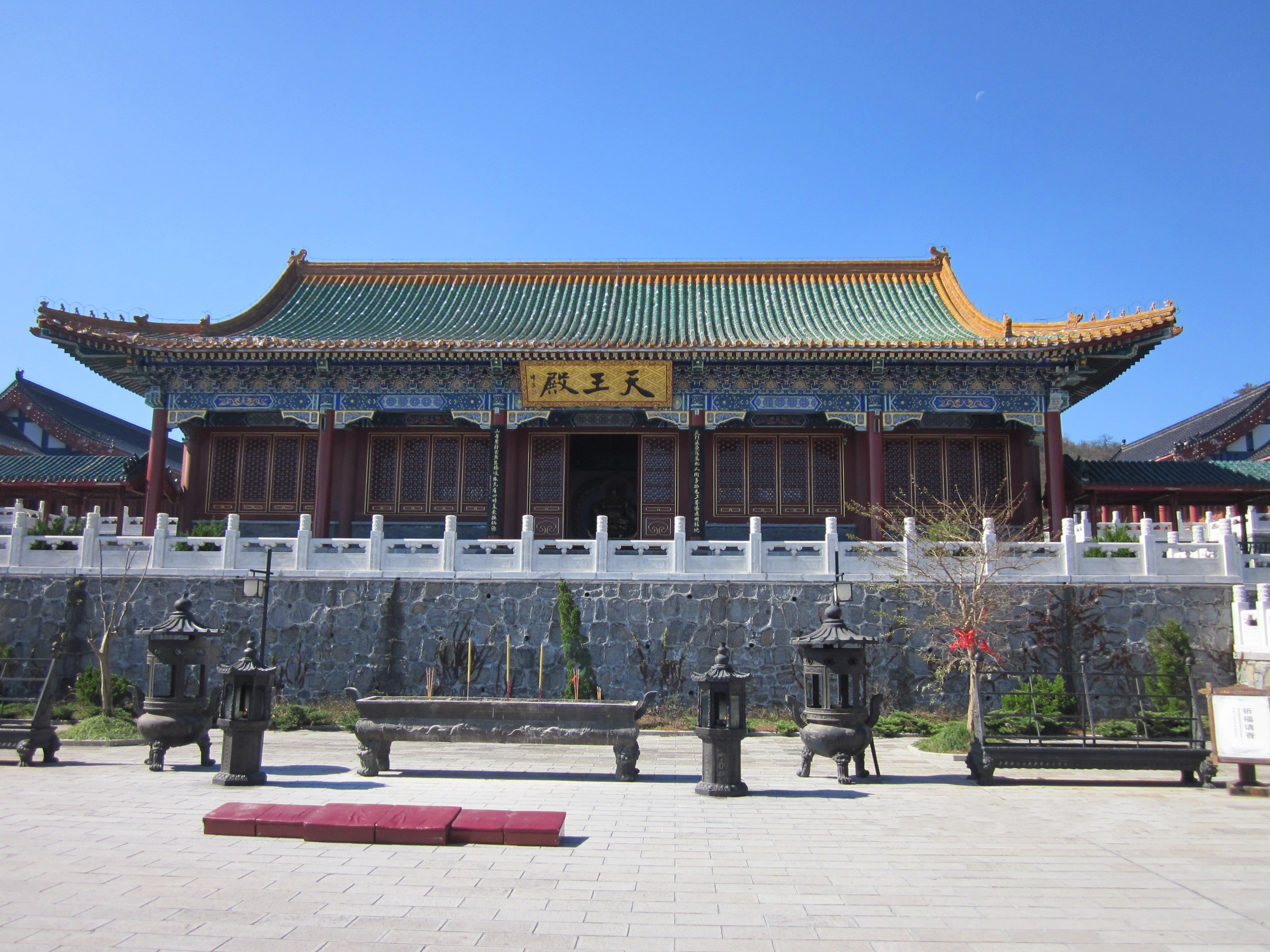
Tianwang dian of Tianmenshan Temple in Zhangjiajie, Hunan, China. Rebuilt in 1949.

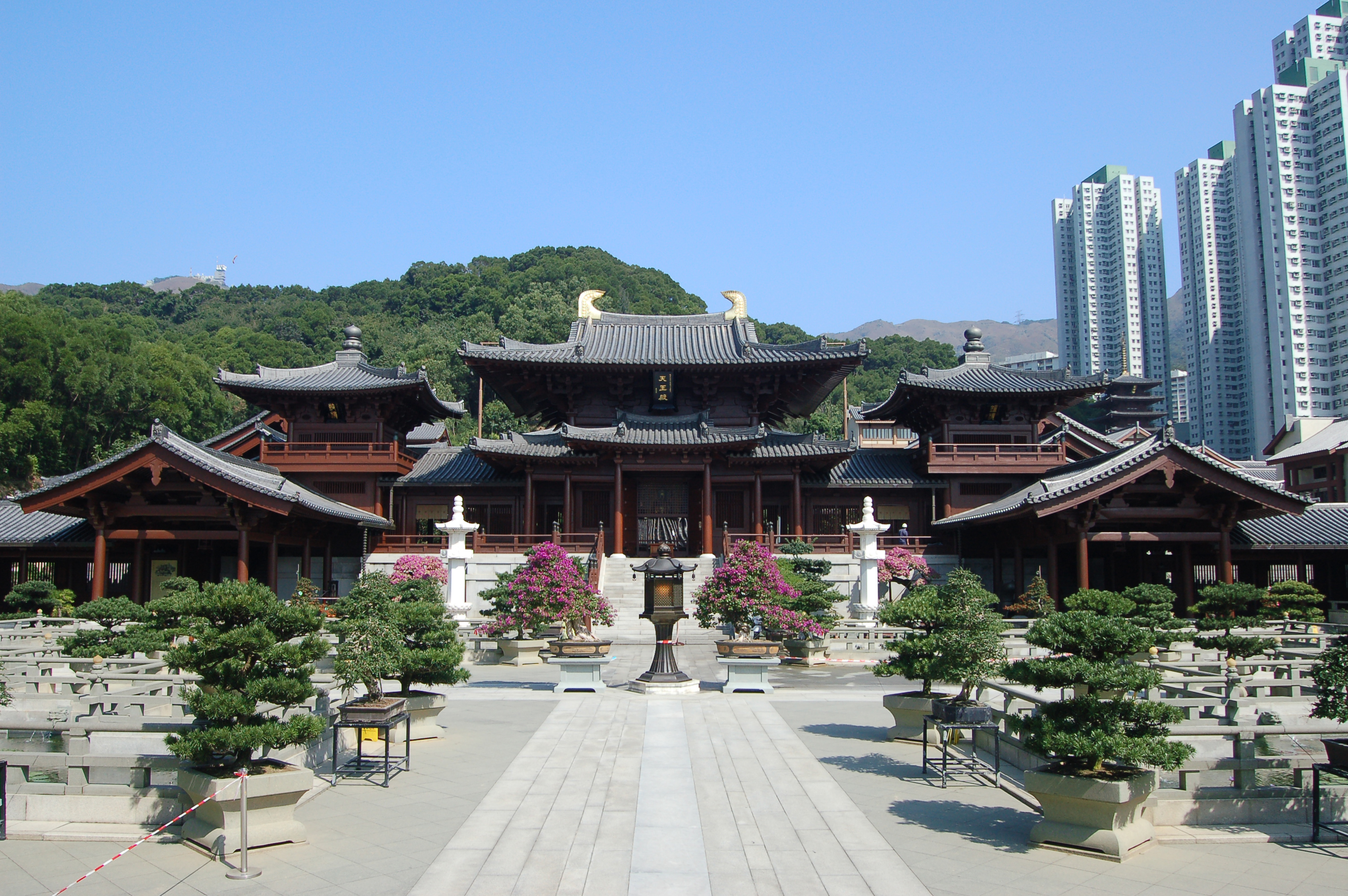
Tianwang dian of Chi Lin Nunnery in Hong Kong. Rebuilt in 2018.
