= Dogapsa =

Buddhist temple in Yeongam, South Korea

- 도갑사
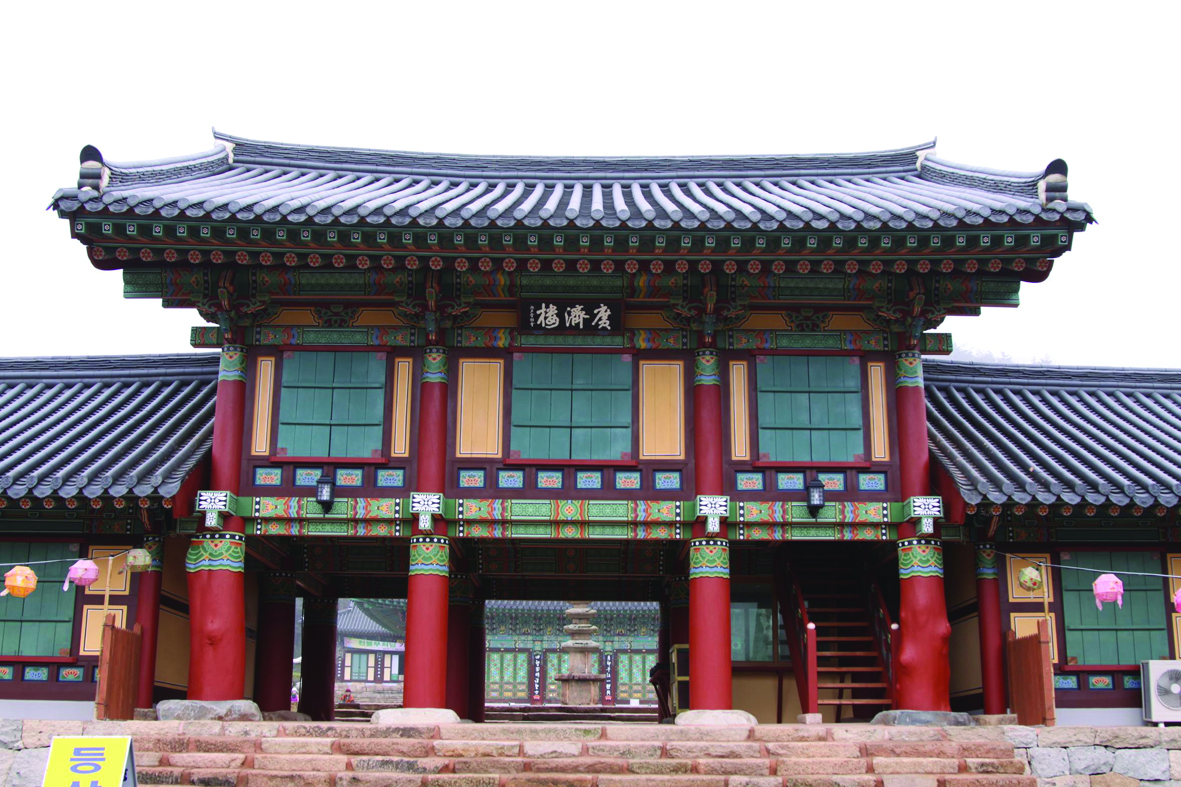
- Dogapsa Guide map

- Location within South Korea

Religion
- Affiliation: Jogye Order of Korean Buddhism

Location
- Location: 306 Dogapsa-ro Gunseo-myeon Yeongam-gun South Jeolla Province (Korean: 전라남도 영암군 군서면 도갑사로 306)
- Country: South Korea
- Coordinates: 34°45′10.6″N 126°39′46.6″E

Dogapsa is a Buddhist temple in South Jeolla Province in Yeongam County, South Korea.

== History ==
Established by Ven. Doseon Guksa and Reconstructed by Ven. Sumi Daesa

Dogapsa Temple (Korean: 도갑사; Hanja: 道岬寺; Pronounced “Do-gap-sa”) was established by Doseon Guksa, one of four eminent monks of Silla, in the 6th year of the reign of Silla's King Heongang. No records about it from the Goryeo era exist, but in 1456 in early Joseon Sumi Daesa rebuilt it into a large temple. Appointed National Preceptor by King Sejong, he reconstructed the temple with royal support so that it covered an area of 966 bays.

In 1653, the stele of Doseon Sumi and the stele for the reconstruction of Dogapsa Temple's stone bridge were made. The inscriptions on both were written by Yi Gyeong-seok, Yi Su-in and Jeong Du-gyeong, who at that time were serving as Chief State Councilors and Ministers of Justice. Later in 1677, flagpole supports were erected, and in 1682, a large stone basin was built to store water. In the mid-18th century, Ven. Yeondam Yuil, a scholar of Avatamsaka studies, lived here and published a Buddhist dictionary titled Seokjeon yuhae (釋典類解).

Little is known of Dogapsa Temple's history after the 19th century. A number of its cultural objects were damaged or lost during the Japanese invasion (1597-1598) and the Manchu invasion (1636-1637). What few items of cultural heritage remained were destroyed during the Japanese occupation of Korea (1910-1945) and the Korean War (1950-1953). When Sumi Daesa reconstructed the temple, there were 12 associated hermitages, including Sangdongam, Sangyeonam and Bijeonam, but at present there are only two, Sanggyeon-seongam and Dongam.

In 1977, a fire broke out due to the carelessness of a visitor that destroyed the Main Buddha Hall, called Daeung-bojeon, and many sacred cultural objects. Daeung-bojeon was restored in 1981. Another restoration project was carried out following a massive excavation survey done in 2009.

== Cultural properties ==
Dogapsa Temple has many cultural items, including: the Liberation Gate (National Treasure No. 50); Rock-Carved Seated Maitreya Bas-Relief (National Treasure No. 144); Seated Stone Buddha (Treasure No. 89); Child Manjusri on Lion and Child Samantabhadra on Elephant (Treasures No. 1134); Five-Story Stone Pagoda (Treasure No. 1433); a large stone basin; and the stele of Ven. Doseon-Sinmi (Treasure No. 1395).

== Tourism ==
It also offers temple stay programs where visitors can experience Buddhist culture.

== Gallery ==
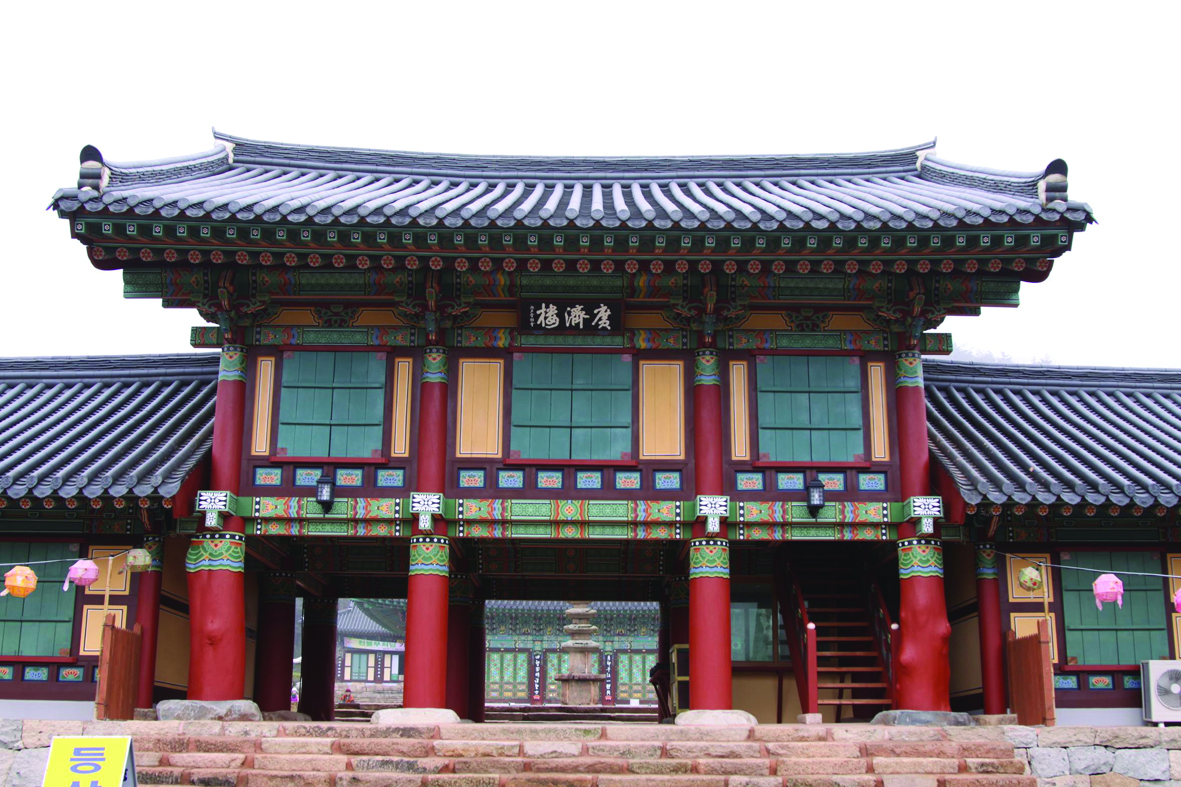

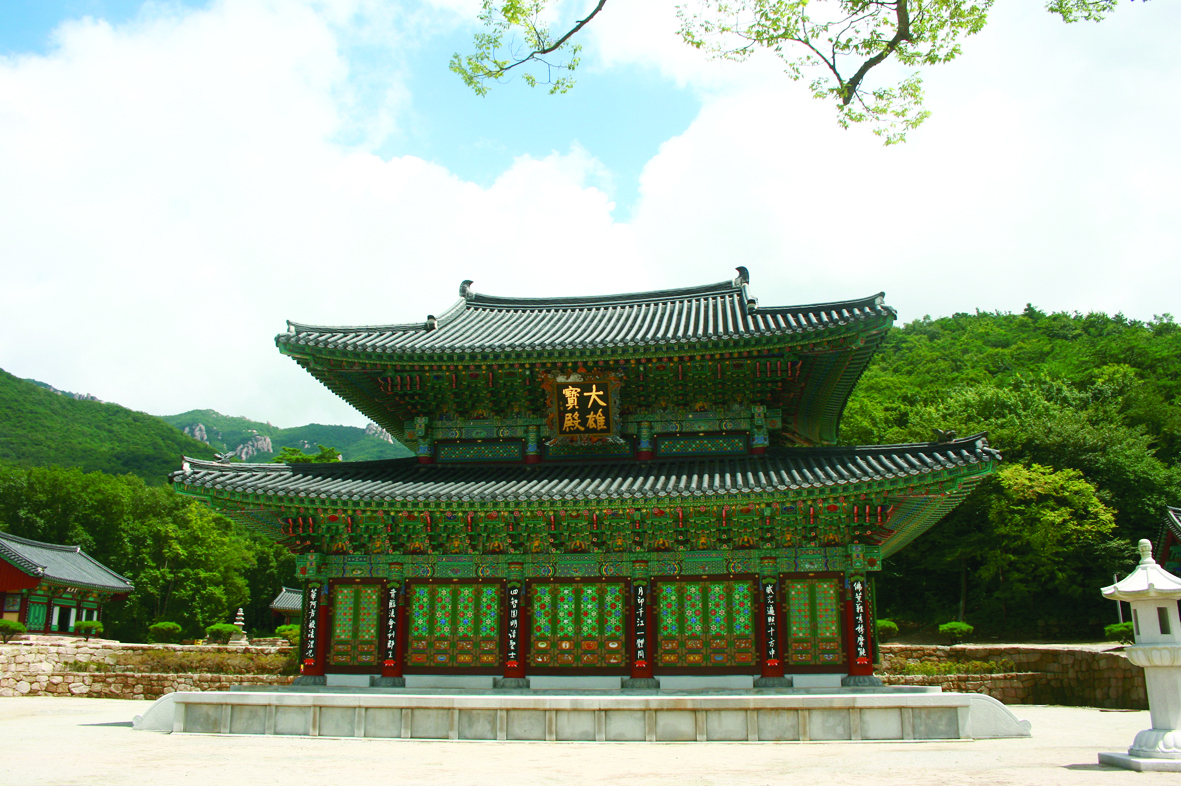
