= Korean Buddhist sculpture =

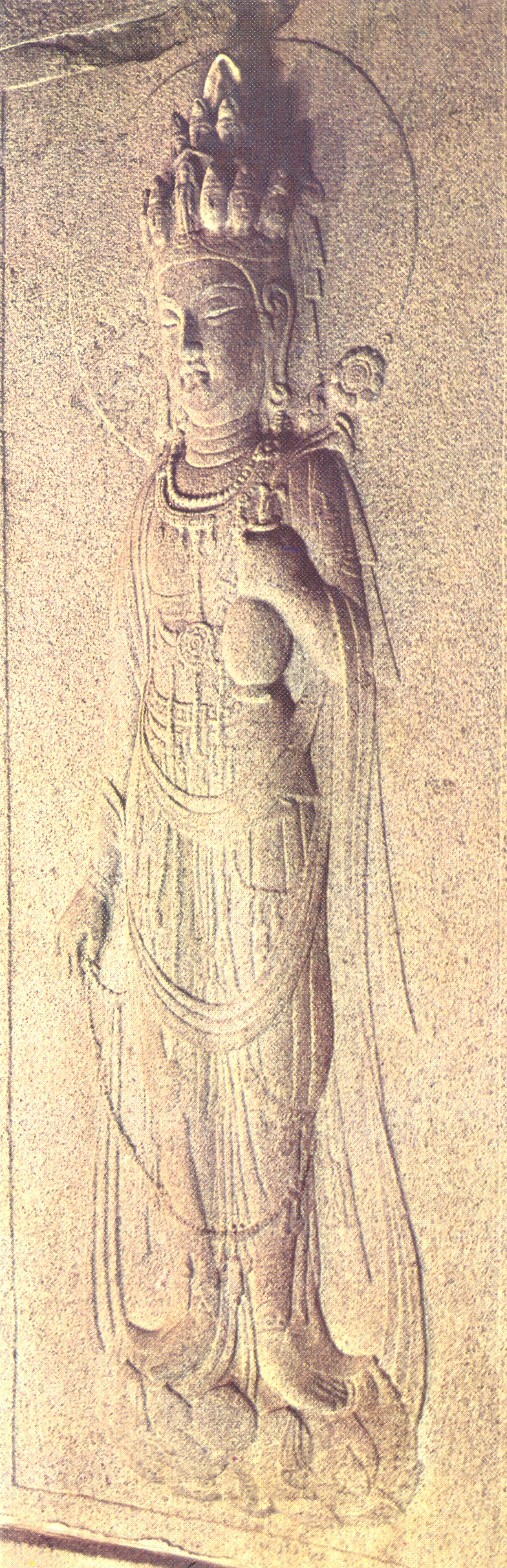
Eleven-faced Avalokitesvara. Silla, 8th century. It is on the back wall under the dome of the Seokguram in Gyeongju Korea. It stands 2.18 meters in height. The Avalokitesvara wears a crown, is dressed in robes and jewelry and holds a vase containing a lotus blossom.

Korean Buddhist sculpture is one of the major areas of Korean art. Buddhism, a religion originating in what is now India, was transmitted to Korea via China in the late 4th century. Buddhism introduced major changes in Korean society. The complexity of the religious sutras sent to Korea required the aristocrats who adopted the religion to become literate and required the training and importation of literate scribes. Little evidence of religious art exists in Korea before the introduction of Buddhism. Subsequent to its introduction, the religion inspired the production of devotional art as well as the beginnings of sophisticated temple architecture.

Images of the Buddha were probably first imported by monks sent from China and the Buddhist sculpture of Korea is indebted to prototypes developed in India, Central Asia, and China. From these influences, a distinctive Korean style formed. Korean Buddhas typically exhibit Korean facial characteristics, were made with native casting and carving techniques, and employed only some of the motifs that were developed earlier in Buddhist art. Additionally, Korean artisans fused together different styles from different regions with their own tastes to form a native art tradition. Korean art is too often incorrectly described in Western literature as merely a passive bridge transmitting Chinese art to Japan. One area of Korean art where this is decidedly not the case is in Korean Buddhist sculpture. Korean stylistic developments and forms were greatly influential in the Asuka, Hakuhō, and Tenpyo periods of Japanese Buddhist sculpture when Korea transmitted Buddhism to Japan in the 6th century.

Buddhist sculpture remains an important form of art in Korea today.

== Background ==
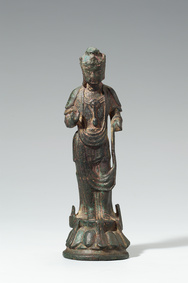
Gilt-bronze standing bodhisattva. Three Kingdoms of Korea period. National Museum of Korea.

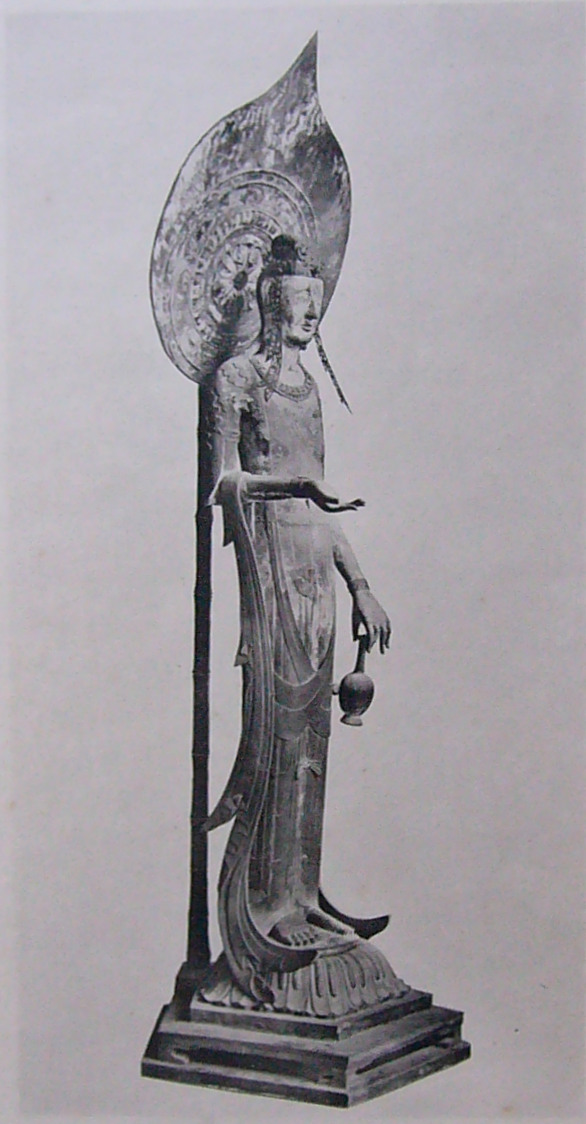
The Kudara Kanon (literally Baekje or Paekche Avolikitesvara) at the temple Horyuji, Japan. Wood. This statue is believed to have originated in Korea or was carved by immigrant Korean artisans.

Korean Buddhist sculpture are relatively rare. The Joseon dynasty suppressed Buddhism with Confucianism as the state religion and destroyed most Buddhist sculptures. According to the Veritable Records of the Joseon Dynasty on April 5, 1424, only 36 Buddhist temples were allowed to exist and the others were destroyed. The relative scarcity of images makes it especially difficult for scholars to completely understand the development of the art in Korea. Images available for study are generally those that have been excavated, the lucky survivors of peninsular tumult, or those images preserved in Japan. Experts may, therefore, have differing opinions on the exact age or place of manufacture for any specific image based on available information.

Each individual Buddhist sculpture has various characteristics and attributes which art historians use as clues to determine when and where it was made. Sometimes a statue will have an inscription or contain a document which attests to when, where, and who made it. Reliable archaeological records which state where a statue was excavated are also valuable clues for the historian. However, when neither of these sources of information are available, scholars can still glean important information on an individual statue by its style, the particular iconography employed by the artist, physical characteristics such as the material used to make the statue, the percentage of metals used in an alloy, casting and carving techniques, and various other contextual clues.

Images in Korea are made from a variety of material: wood, lacquer, metal, clay, and stone. Those that survive today are typically small bronze votive images used for private worship and sculpture carved in granite, the most abundant sculpting material available in Korea. Monumental images made for state-sponsored monasteries and devotional objects the royal and aristocratic families, for the most part, have unfortunately not survived. Although wood and lacquer images were known to have been made in Korea based on historical records and can be assumed based on surviving images in China and Japan, the fragility of these materials mean very few have survived in Korea.

== Three Kingdoms period (traditionally 57 BCE–668), 4th and 5th centuries ==
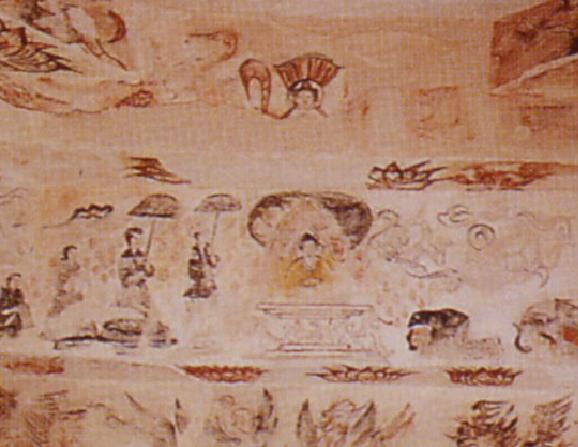
Detail of Buddha, Goguryeo Korea, late 5th century. Mural painting, eastern ceiling of main burial chamber, Jangcheon-ri Tomb No.1, Ji'an, Jilin province, China.

During the Three Kingdoms period, Korea was divided into three competing states, Goguryeo, Baekje, and Silla, whose boundaries ran from Manchuria to the tip of southern Korea. A fourth polity in the south, Gaya also flourished during this period but no Buddhist image can be definitively attributed to this state. According to the Samguk sagi and Samguk yusa, the two oldest extant histories of Korea, Buddhism was officially introduced to Korea during the 4th century. In addition, the Haedong goseungjeon states that monks from China were already in Korea prior to its official reception. Sundo, a monk from Former Qin, a northern Chinese state, was received by the king of Goguryeo in northern Korea in 372 and an Indian monk via Serindian, Malananda (Kr. Marananta), from southern China's Eastern Jin dynasty was received by the king of Baekje in the southern Korea in 384. Ado, a Buddhist monk, brought Buddhism to Silla in central Korea. Archaeological discoveries have corroborated these assertions of the early introduction of Buddhism into Korea with the discovery of Goguryeo tomb murals with Buddhist motifs and the excavation of lotus shaped roof tiles dated to the 4th century. The rulers of both Korean kingdoms welcomed the foreign monks and immediately ordered monasteries be built for their use. The construction of Buddhist images soon followed.

The Ttukseom (McCune–Reischauer: Ttuksŏm) Buddha (image), named for the area of Seoul in which it was discovered, is the earliest statue of Buddha in Korea. Scholars date it to the late 4th or early 5th century, around 400. The five centimeter tall gilt-bronze statuette follows certain stylistic conventions originating in Gandhara (present-day Pakistan), which were later adopted by China. These include the rectangular platform upon which the Buddha sits which depicts two lions, a common symbol of Buddha. Additionally, it displays the dhyana mudra, a gesture of meditation, commonly found in early seated Buddhas of China and Korea, where the hands are interlocked and rest on the lap. A 5th-century mural of Buddha found in a tomb just to the north of the modern border of North Korea shares several stylistic similarities with the Ttukseom Buddha including the depiction of the dhyana mudra, the fact that the robes cover both shoulders of the body, and the depiction of two lions around the rectangular base.

The stylistic similarities of this Buddha to those found in China lead most scholars to conclude that the image is an import. The possibility remains that the image is a Korean copy of a Chinese prototype. One reason to argue for a Korean provenance is the fact that the rectangular base of the Ttukseom Buddha is solid while Chinese examples are hollow, perhaps indicating a still developing sculpture casting tradition in early Korea. The discovery of the Ttukseom Buddha near the proposed site of Baekje's first capital and major citadel suggests the figure may be an example of Baekje sculpture. A very similar meditating Buddha discovered in the later Baekje capital of Sabi (now known as Buyeo) supports this theory, indicating these first images of Buddha were influential many years after their introduction or had been preserved to be transferred to a new capital. Other scholars suggest that the Ttukseom figure may be a Goguryeo piece because of the close stylistic similarities the figure has with the northern dynastic art, a typical feature of early Goguryeo sculpture.

Two Chinese examples shown below, one at the Asian Art Museum in San Francisco and the other at the National Palace Museum in Taipei illustrate the similarities between early Korean and Chinese images. A Serindian example from the 5th century also displays the dhyana mudra and similar treatment of the robes in addition to also being example of the confluence of cultures along the Silk Road from India to Gandhara to China to Korea.

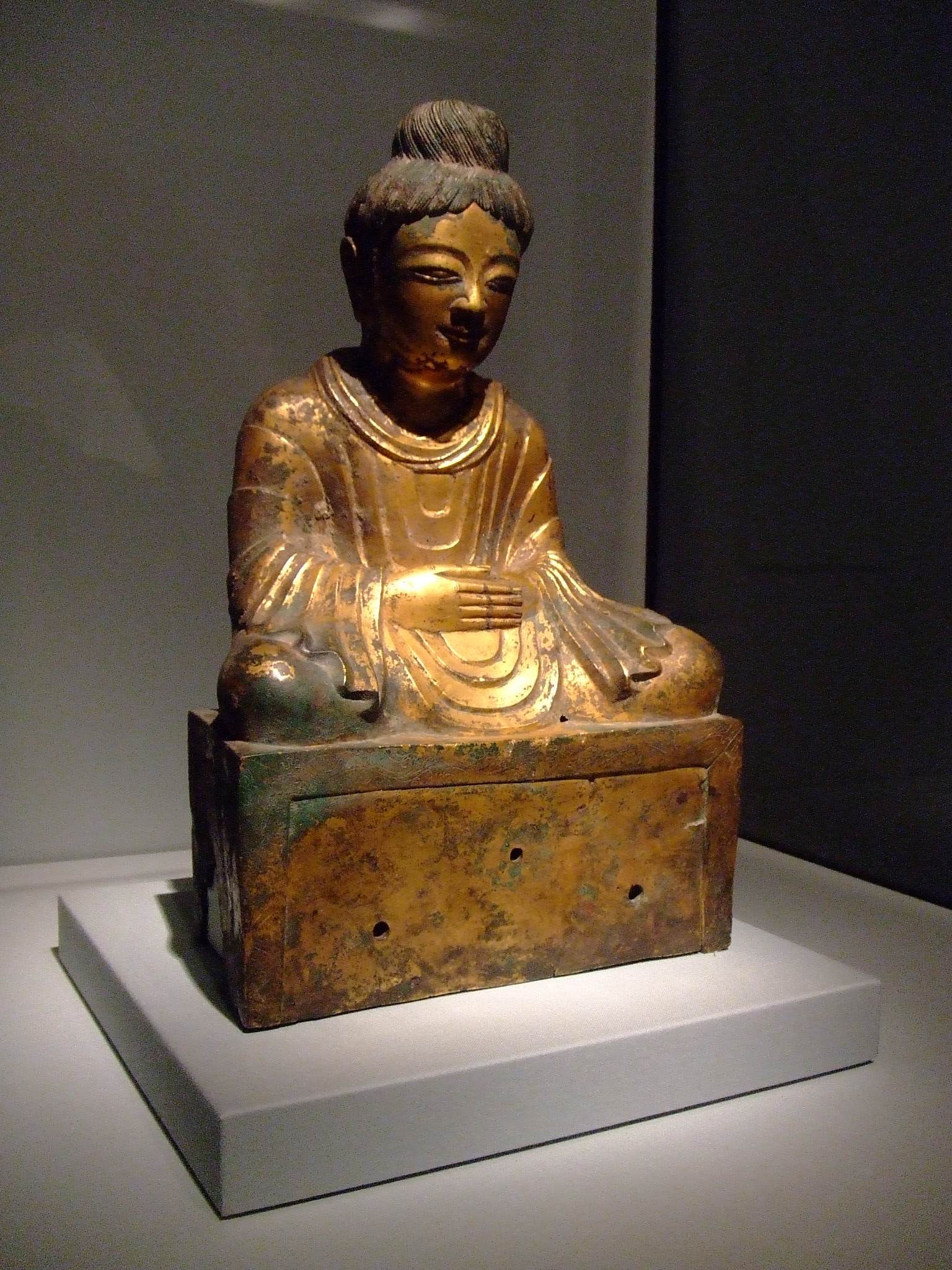
A Chinese prototype of the Ttukseom Buddha at the Asian Art Museum, San Francisco, U.S.

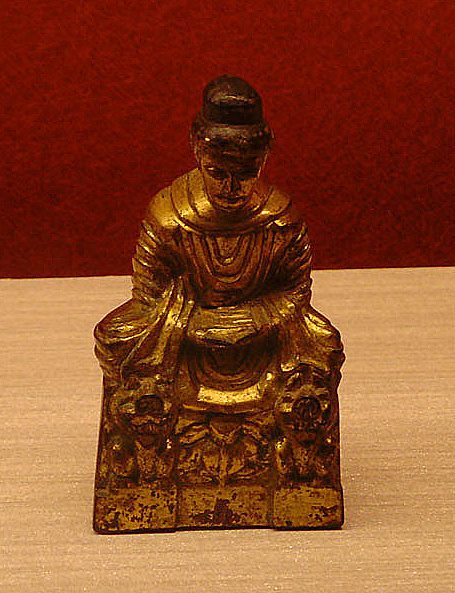
A Chinese prototype of the Ttukseom Buddha at the National Palace Museum in Taipei, Taiwan.

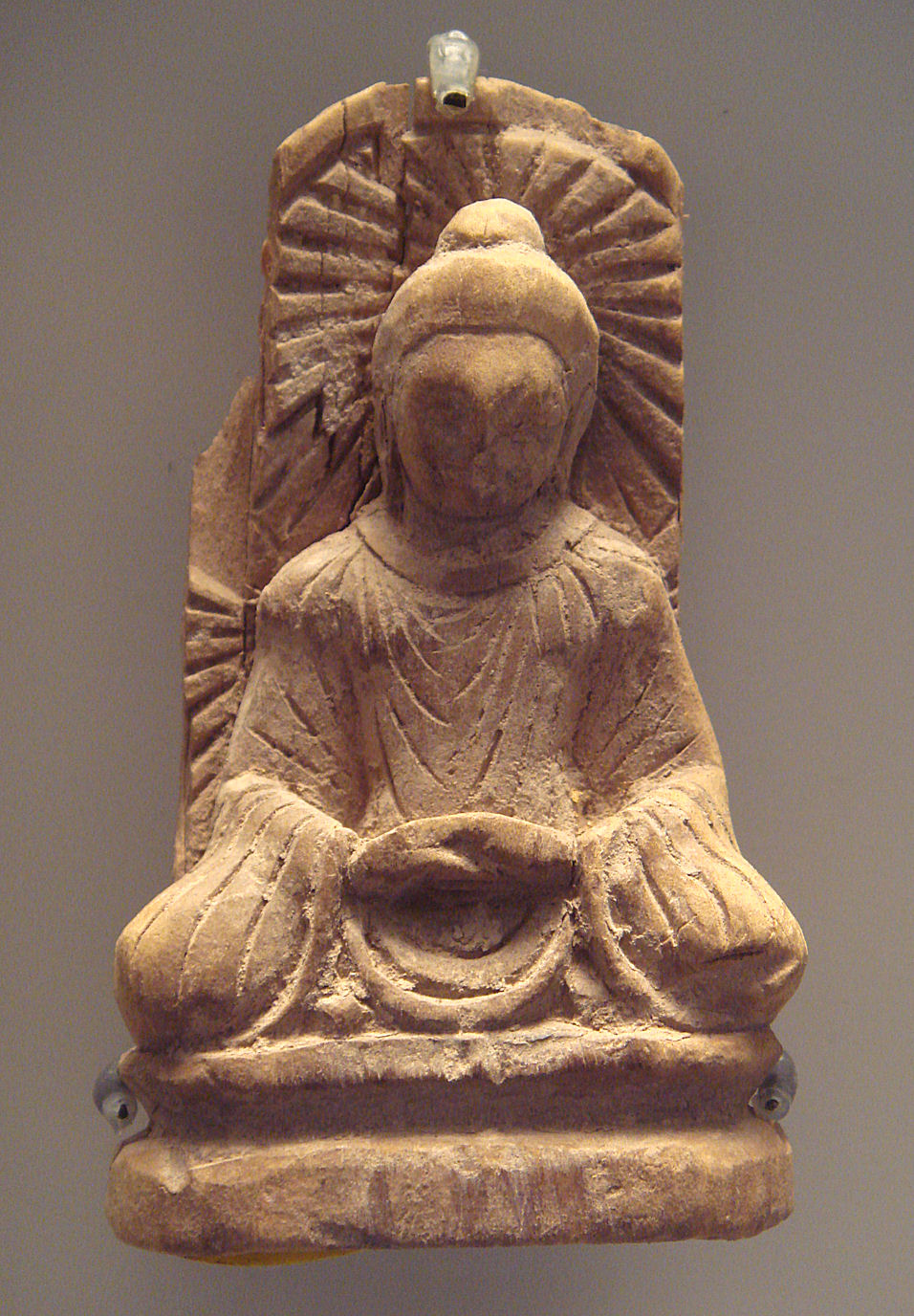
Serindian example at the Musée Guimet in Paris, France.

The only other examples of Korean Buddhist sculpture from the 4th or 5th century are some terra cotta fragments from Goguryeo. Some scholars believe that the paucity of extant images from the earliest period of Korean Buddhism is due to the fact that the religion was practiced by a small number of aristocrats and did not become popular with the general population until the 6th century. Another reason for the lack of early images may be because the site of the earliest period of Baekje history is within the city of Seoul, an area so developed that it is difficult to excavate, while Goguryeo archaeological sites are generally off limits to South Korean scholars because they lie mostly in North Korea.

== Three Kingdoms period, 6th century ==
=== Buddha images ===
Seated Buddha images

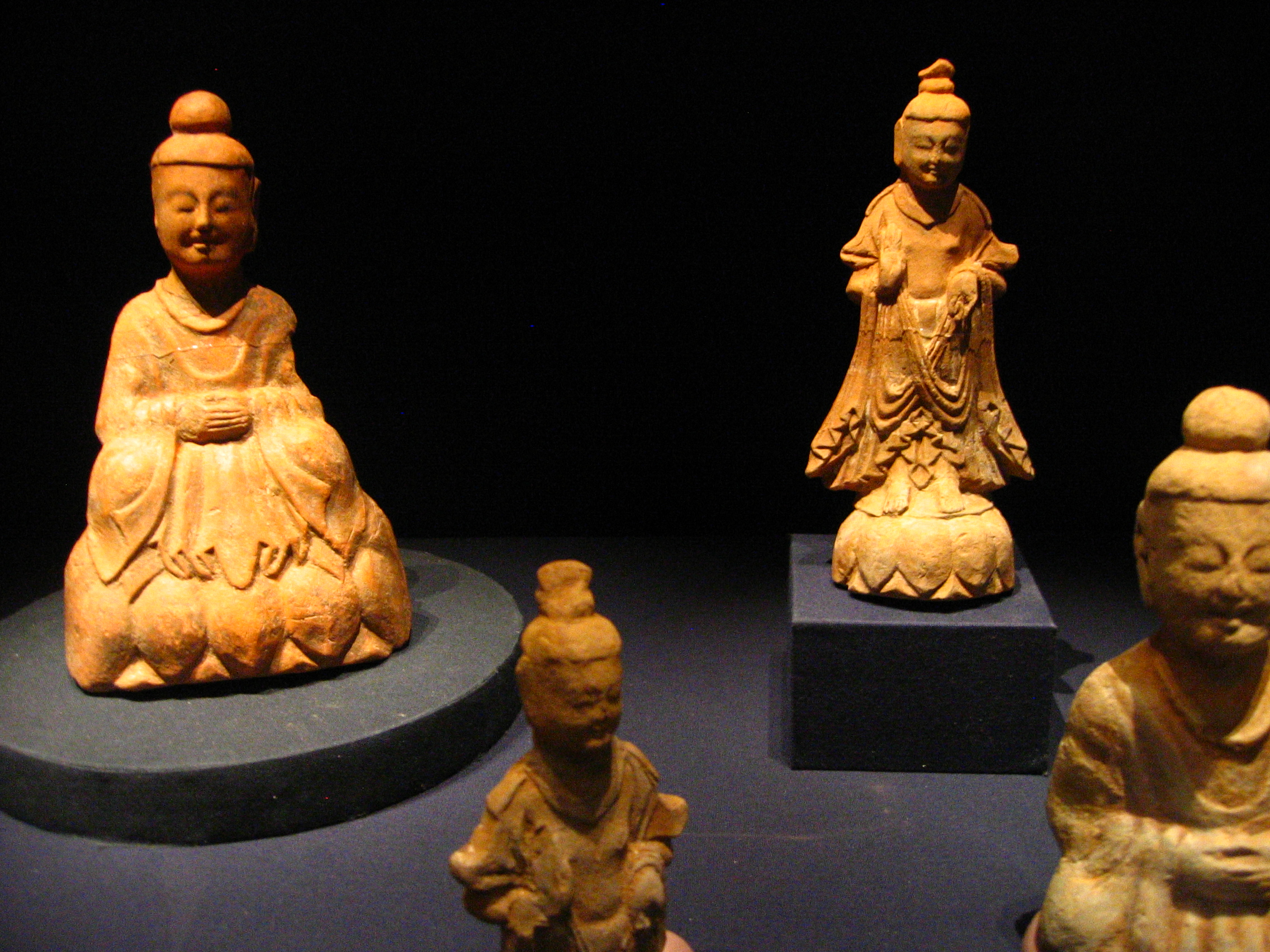
Seated Buddhas and bodhisattvas from Wono-ri, Goguryeo, first half of the 6th century. Ceramic, height of bodhisattva 17 cm. National Museum of Korea.

Seated Buddha imagery remained popular during the 6th century in Korea. As mentioned above, an archaic seated Buddha resembling the Ttukseom Buddha was discovered in modern-day Buyeo, a city the Baekje king made his capital in 538. This old style was soon discarded for newer influences. By the second half of the 6th century while sculptors maintained the dhyana mudra they opted to displace the rectangular lion throne iconography for complicated drapery which were depicted cascading over the Buddha's seat. A seated Buddha at the National Museum of Korea while starkly different from its chronological counterpart, the Kunsu-ri seated Buddha from Baekje, in style shows that both kingdoms were adopting this new approach to seated figures. The Goguryeo seated Buddha displays typical Goguryeo traits, such as the rounded ushnisha and head and hands disproportionately larger relative to the body. The depiction of the folds of the robe over a now lost rectangular throne are exuberant with no sense of following a set scheme.

A Baekje soapstone seated Buddha discovered at the Kunsu-ri temple site in Buyeo displays the soft roundness and static nature of the early Baekje style during the second half of the 6th century. Unlike the Ttukseom seated Buddha, the Kunsu-ri Buddha features the robes of the Buddha draped over the rectangular platform and does away with the lions common in earlier images. The symmetrically stylized drapery folds is followed in later Japanese images, such as the Shakyamuni Triad in Hōryū-ji. Like the Ttukseom Buddha, the Kunsu-ri Buddha follows early Chinese and Korean conventions displaying the dhyana mudra. This particular mudra is notably absent in subsequent Japanese Buddhist sculpture which perhaps indicates that the iconography was out of style in Korea by the time Buddhist sculpture began arriving in Japan in the mid-6th century. The seated Buddhas of the late 6th century begin to do away with the meditation gesture in favor of the wish-granting gesture and protection gesture. An example of this kind of seated Buddha is the Paekche triad now at the Tokyo National Museum and is followed by subsequent Japanese images, such as the aforementioned Shakyamuni Triad (image) held at Hōryū-ji.

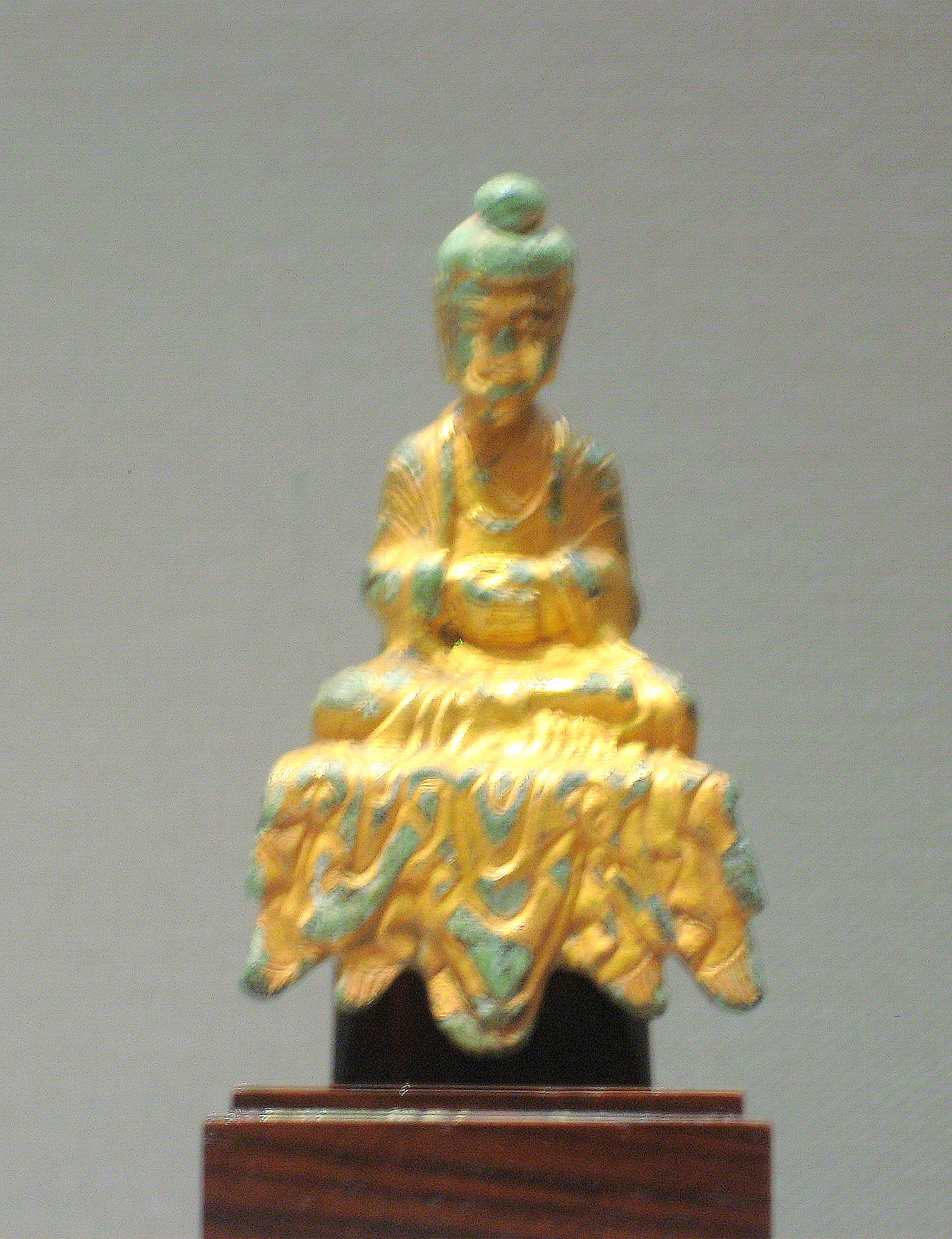
Seated Buddha, Goguryeo, second half of 6th century. Gilt bronze, h. 8.8 cm. National Museum of Korea.

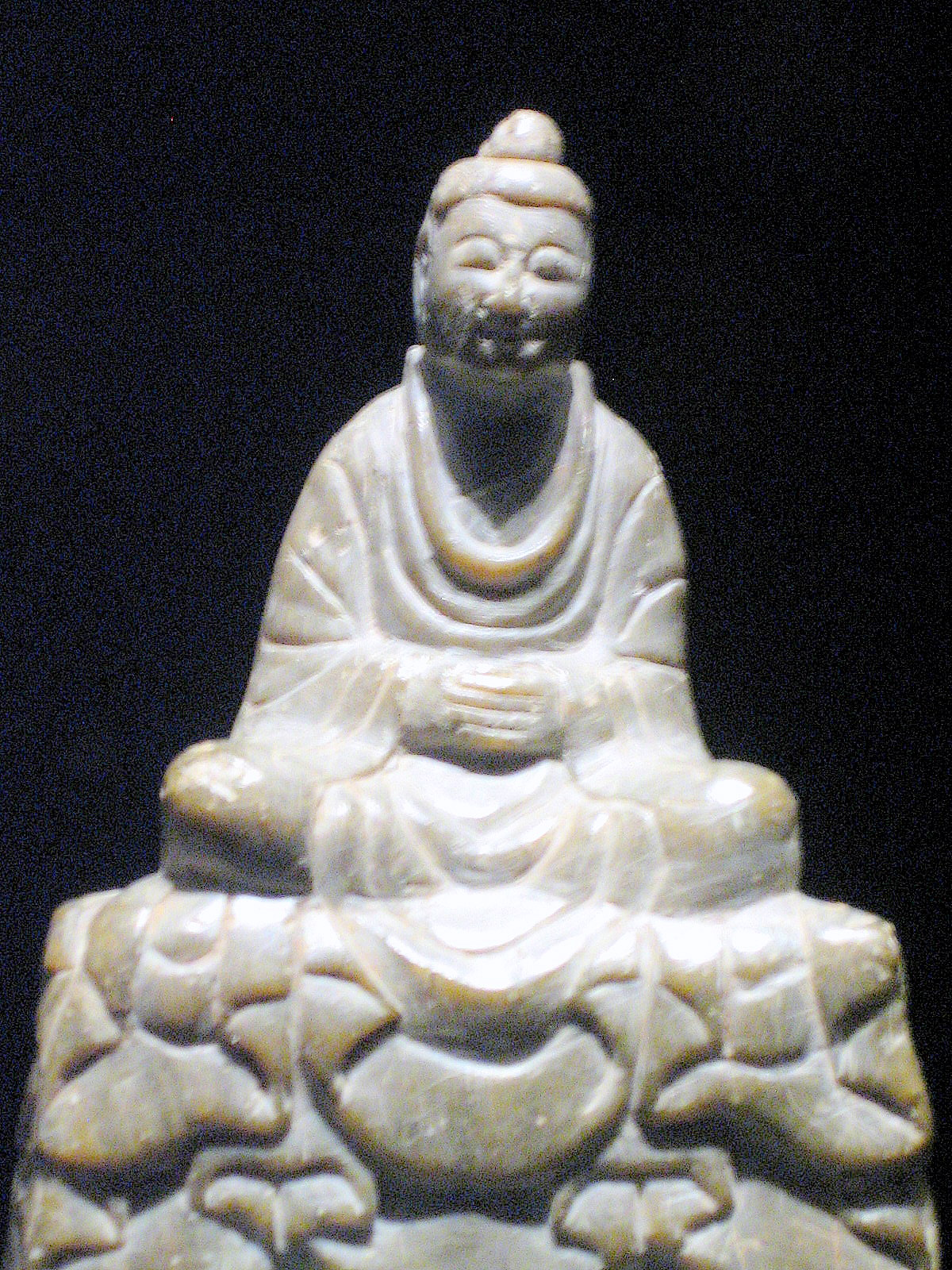
Seated Buddha, Baekje, second half of 6th century. Soapstone, h. 13.5 cm. Buyeo National Museum. Treasure No. 329.

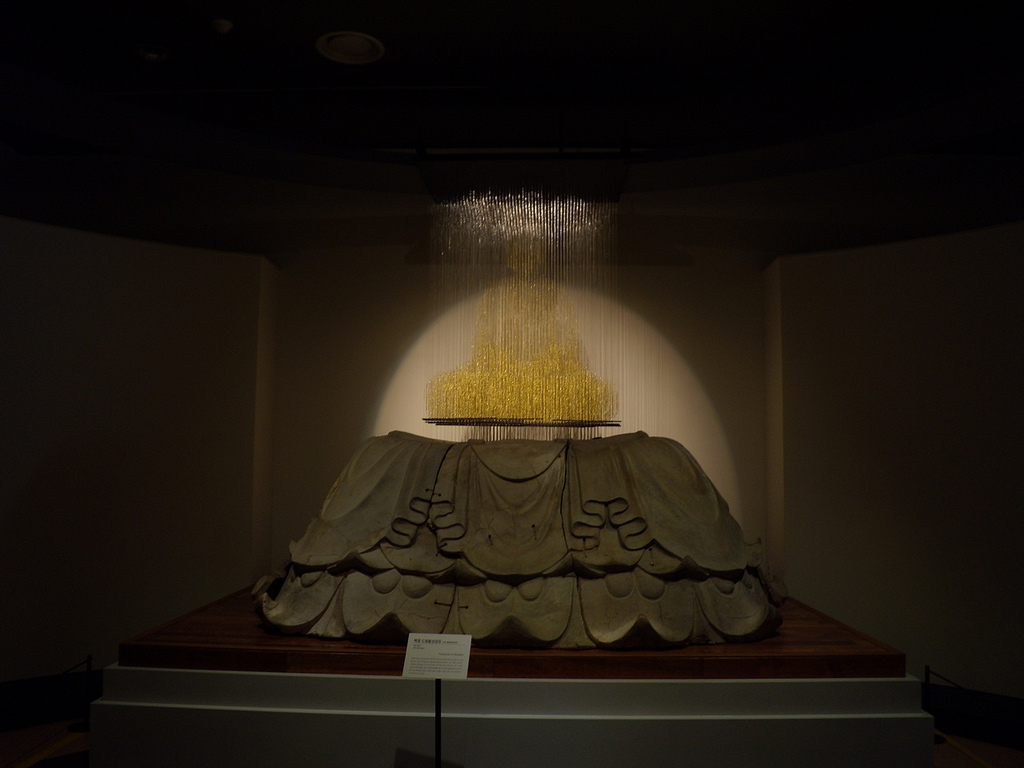
Pedestal, Baekje, second half of 6th century. Clay. Gongju National Museum.

Standing Buddha images

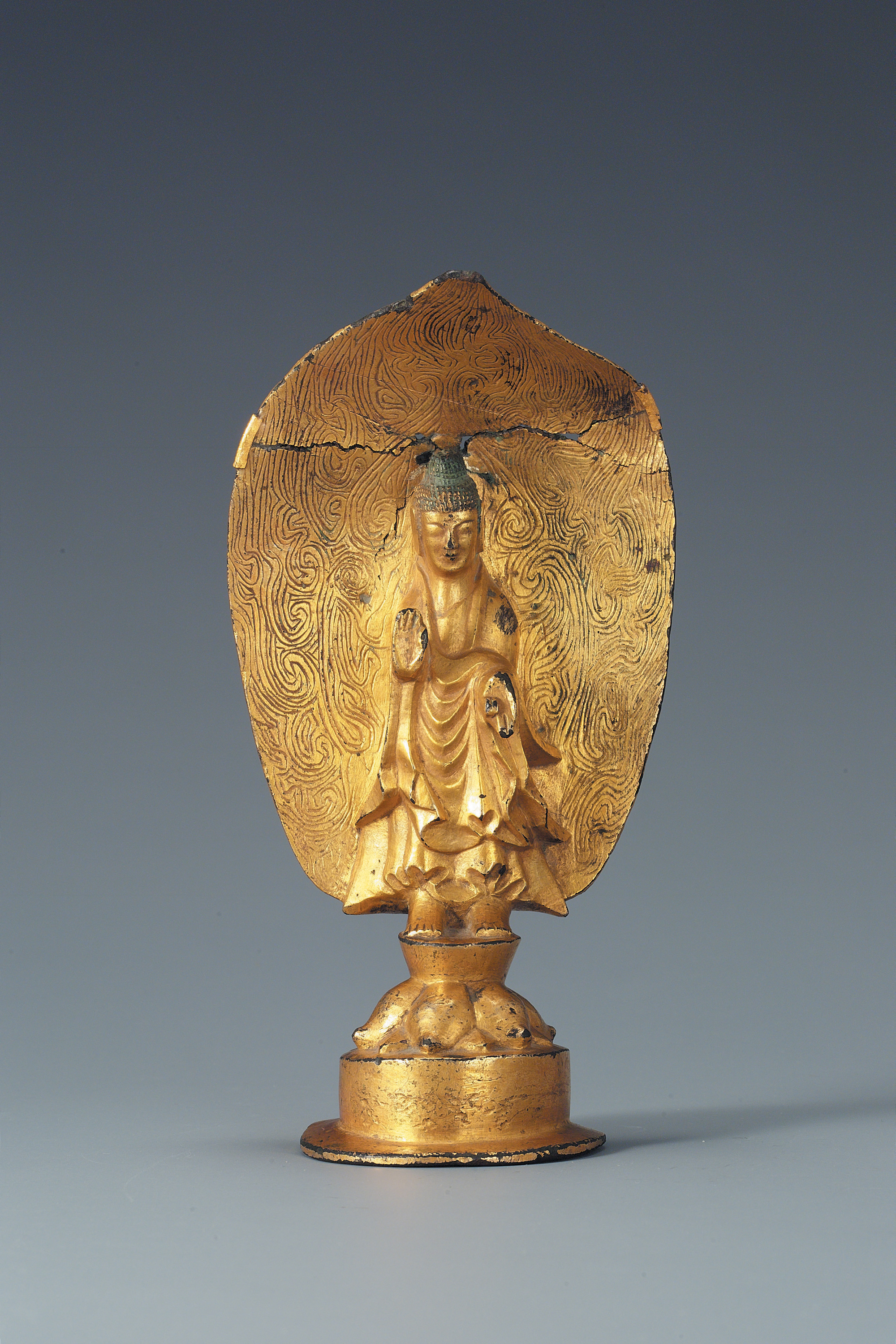
Yŏn'ga Buddha, Goguryeo, 539. Gilt bronze, h. 16.3 cm. National Museum of Korea, National Treasure no. 119.

One of the oldest surviving Korean Buddhas discovered so far is the Yŏn'ga (Revised Romanization: Yeon-ga) Buddha, an image that gives scholars a fair baseline for what images of the early 6th century looked like. The Buddha, the only one of a thousand commissioned to have survived, gets its name from the inscription on its back that mentions a previously unknown Goguryeo reign period. While it was excavated in Uiryong in South Gyeongsang Province, former Silla territory far from the borders of Goguryeo, the inscription clearly states the statue was cast in Nangnang (present-day Pyongyang), Goguryeo. The statue is valuable because its inscription states a site of manufacture and date of manufacture, generally agreed to be 539. Additionally, the image is clear evidence that statues could move beyond national borders to neighboring states.

The rather crude carving on the mandorla of the Buddha exhibits the motion and dynamism typical of Goguryeo art. The figure exhibits the abhaya (no fear) mudra in its upraised proper right hand while the proper left hand displays the varada (wish-granting) mudra. Both mudras are typical of early Korean standing Buddhist sculpture and the folding of the last two fingers of the proper left hand to the palm is commonly found in early Korean sculpture. The Yon'ga Buddha also displays other attributes common to early Goguryeo Buddhas including the lean rectangular face, prominent protuberances on the head (Sanskrit: ushnisha), large hands disproportionate to the body, an emphasis on the front of the figures, fishtail flaring of the robes on the sides, and the flame imagery on the mandorla.

The prototype of this Buddha derives from the non-Chinese Tuoba clan of the Xianbei people who established the Northern Wei dynasty in northern geographic China. An example of a Northern Wei prototype, dated to 524, can be found at the Metropolitan Museum of Art, shown below. An Eastern Wei Buddha (image), dated to 536, is at the University of Pennsylvania Museum. Both images show the strong influence of the Northern Wei and its derivative dynasties on Korean art. Most images inscribed with a date during this period of history used the sexagenary cycle system; dates can be interpreted in more than one way by adding or subtracting sixty-year cycles to the inscribed year. Scholars must date images based on the context provided by other images. For example, the Yŏn'ga Buddha is generally accepted to date to 539 because of contemporaneous images from the Metropolitan Museum of Art and the University of Pennsylvania Museum, discussed above, which date to around that time, 524 and 536 respectively. 60 years before 539 would be a date too early for the Yon'ga Buddha while a date of 599 (adding sixty years) would make the image archaic and out of style.

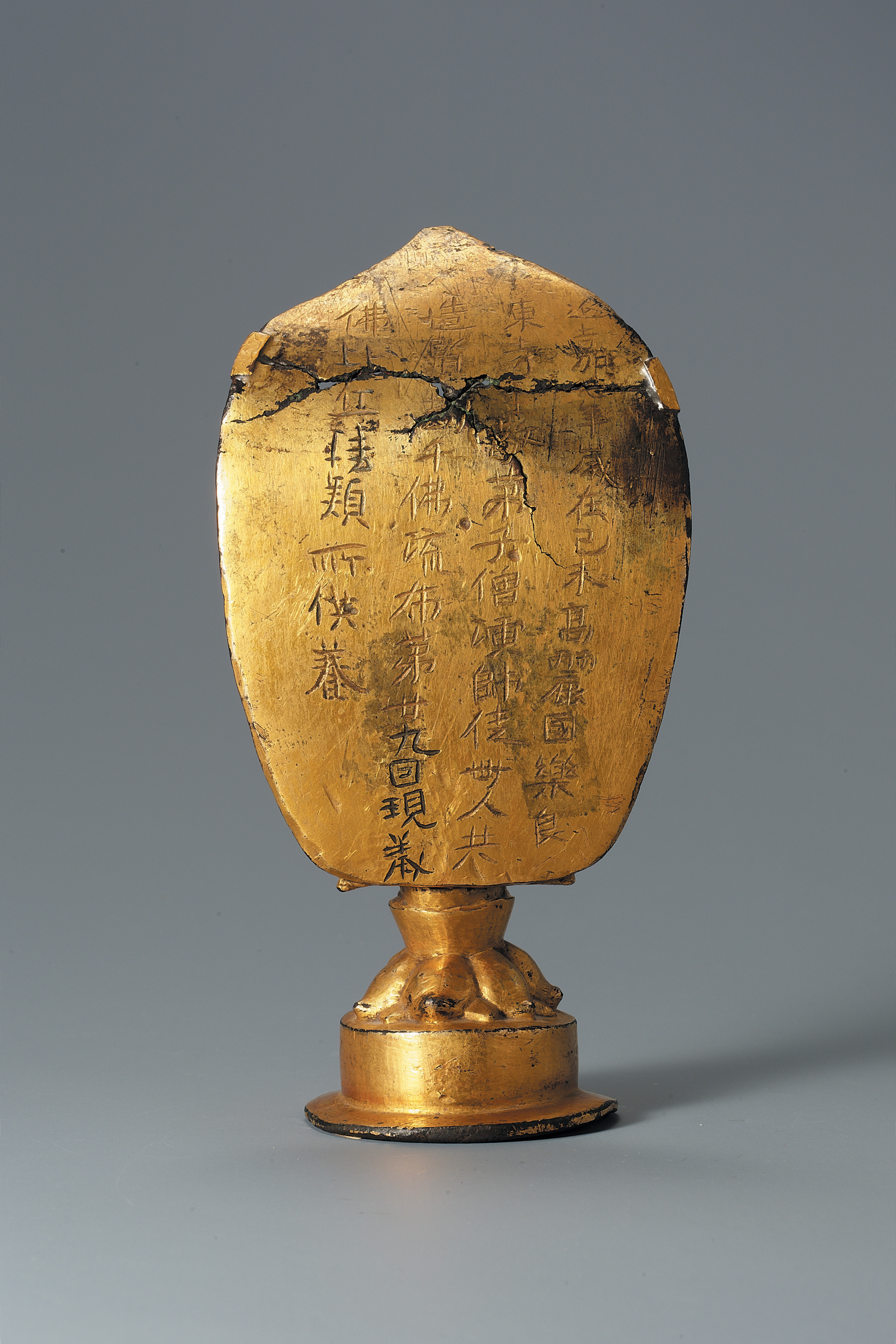
Back view of the Yŏn'ga Buddha. Click image to read a translation of the carved inscription.

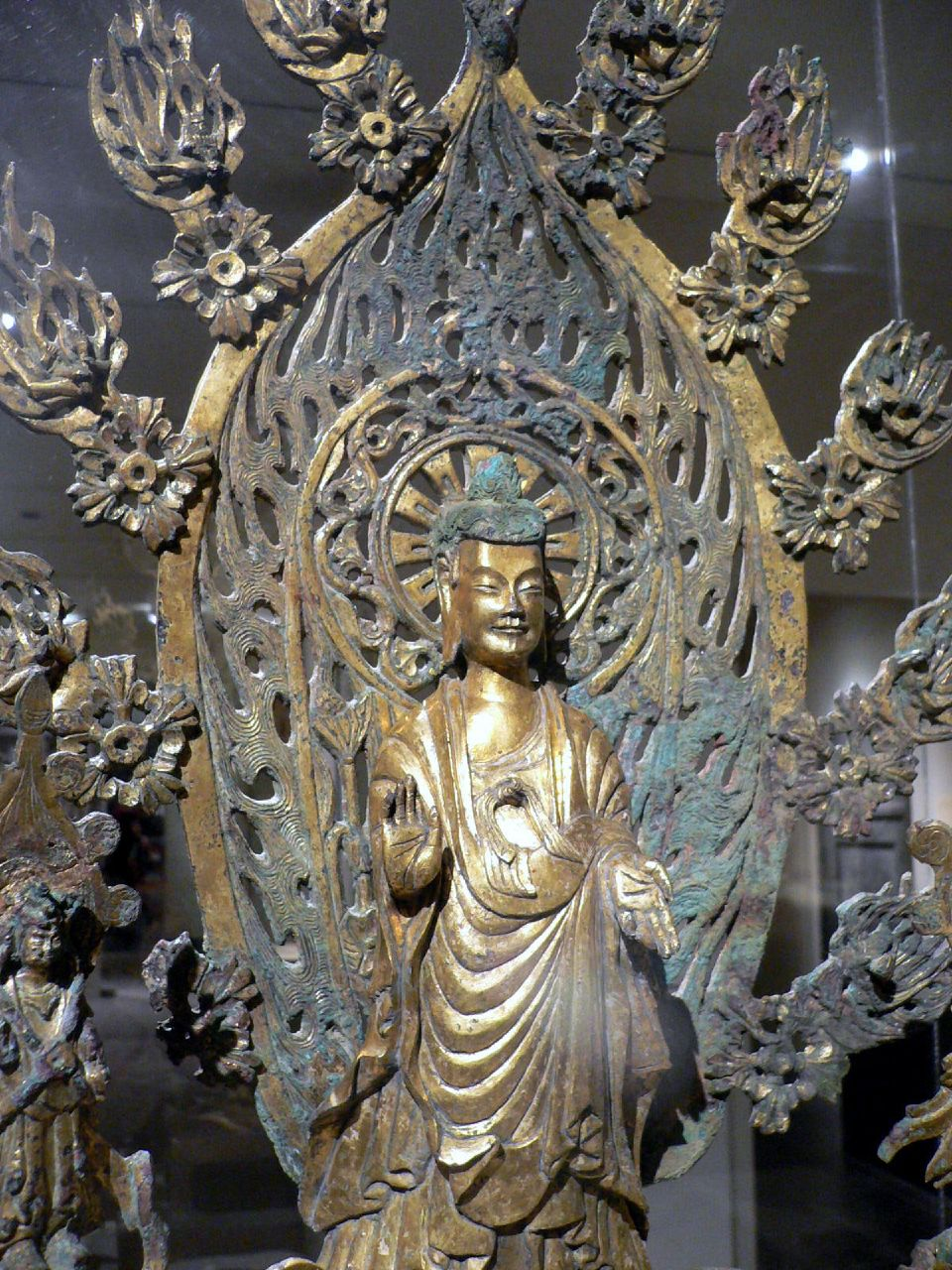
Altarpiece dedicated to Buddha Maitreya, Northern Wei dynasty (386–534), dated 524. Gilt bronze. Metropolitan Museum of Art.

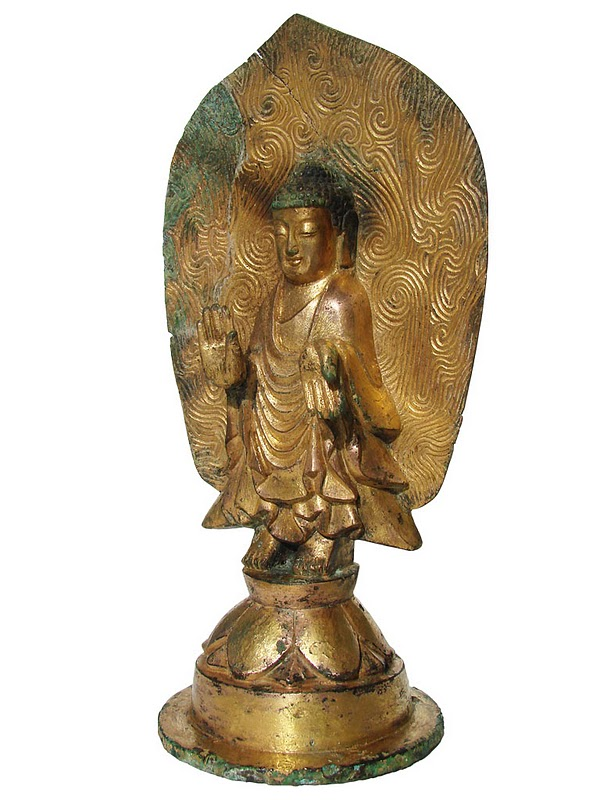
Standing Buddha, probably Baekje period, first half of the 6th century. Gilt bronze. Asian Art Museum of Tokyo. This statue may possibly be older than the Yŏn'ga Buddha.

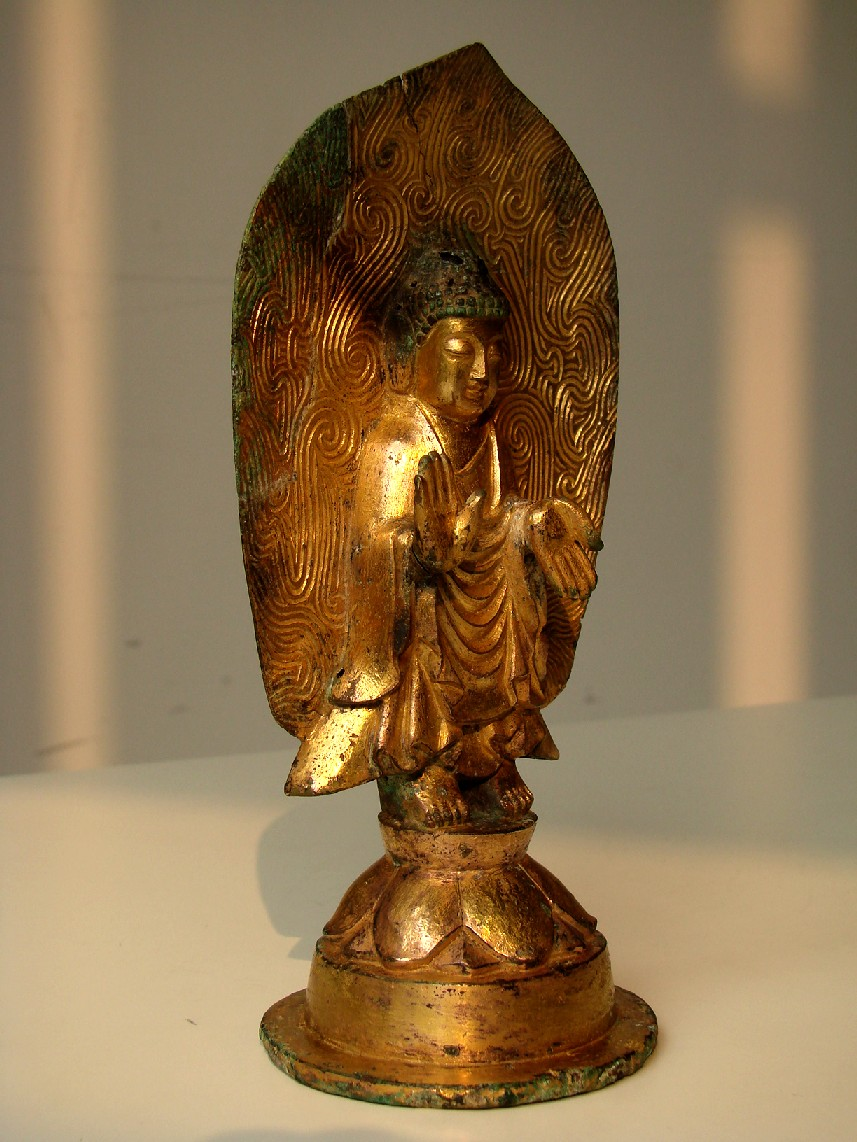
Another view of the Asian Art Museum of Tokyo standing Buddha.

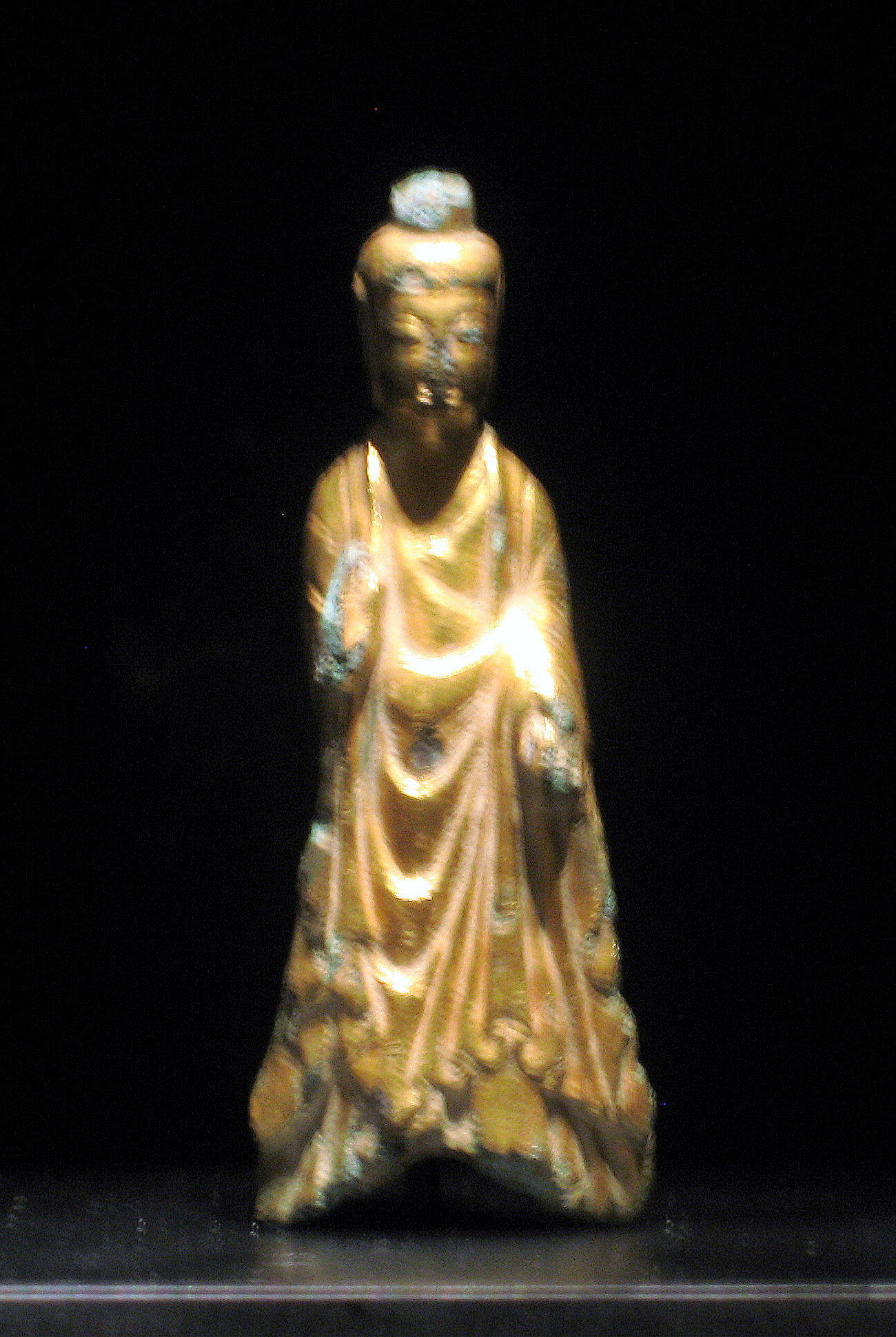
Standing Buddha, Baekje, mid-6th century. Gilt bronze, h. 9.4 cm. Buyeo National Museum.

Baekje sculpture of the 6th century reflect the influence of the native and foreign regimes ruling China during the period of Northern and Southern dynasties. While Korean and Chinese records show direct diplomatic contacts between Baekje and the Northern Wei dynasty occurred during this time period, they pale in comparison to the numerous diplomatic missions between Baekje and the southern dynasties of China. Further complicating the understanding of the source of inspiration for Baekje Buddhist sculpture is the fact that the southern dynasties were influential in the development of northern sculpture and the fact that few images from the southern regimes have survived.

Another example of 6th-century sculpture is a triad now at the Gyeongju National Museum. Like contemporaneous examples from Goguryeo, the statue exhibits traits typical of the Northern Wei style, especially in the depiction of the robes. Some similarities with Goguryeo-specific traits include the fairly crude depiction of the flames in the mandorla, simplification being a common trait in extant early sculpture. The roundness of the face, the smile of the central Buddha as well as the harmonious proportions, static nature of the image, and a sense of warmth and humanity are features typically associated with the Southern dynasties of China, and frequently occur in features of Baekje sculpture as well. The warm climate and fertile environment the kingdom was situated along with native sensibilities are credited as reasons for the Baekje style.

There are several other statues experts believe to be from the early 6th century exist. One (standing buddha image), in the collection of the Asian Art Museum, is very similar to the Yŏn'ga Buddha in size (18.6 cm Vs. 16.3 cm in height) and style. Small differences between the two include the roundness of the face and the lack of plumpness of the lotus petals of the base of the Asian Art Museum image along with the more skillfully carved flame patterns and shape of the mandorla. No inscription was carved on the back of the mandorla but the consensus of Japanese experts dates the image to a time in the 6th century earlier than that of the Yŏn'ga Buddha. The lack of inscription and the subtle differences in styles means that the statue has not been attributed to a specific state in the Three Kingdoms period.

Single mandorla triads

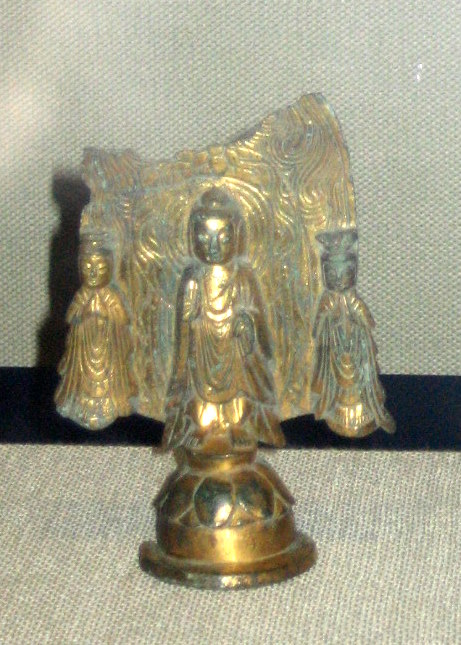
Standing Buddha Triad, Three Kingdoms period, probably Baekje, late 6th century. Gilt bronze, h. 10 cm. Gyeongju National Museum.

The second early 6th-century image is a single mandorla triad, a Buddha image flanked by two bodhisattvas who are grouped standing in front of a single halo from the Korean Central History Museum in Pyongyang, North Korea. This image has an inscription on the back of the mandorla that scholars have interpreted to mean 539. Of the three images from the early 6th century mentioned, this North Korean image is the most sophisticated in its modeling of the Buddha and attendants. A famous triad from the Gansong Art Museum nearly identical to the North Korean triad is usually attributed to the Goguryeo Kingdom and is typically dated to 563, showing that styles from 539 were still popular more than two decades later. Finally, some scholars suggest that a mandorla excavated in North Chungcheong Province should be dated to 536.

The single-mandorla triad was a very popular type of image in the 6th century, with several whole triads surviving as well as figures surviving without mandorla and mandorla surviving without figures. The Gansong Art Museum type was particularly popular with copies in Seoul, Pyongyang, and an independent central Buddha which was excavated in Buyeo whose current whereabouts are unknown.

One of the most frequent types of images that were made throughout the century are single-mandorla triads. The similarities between the triads found in the former Baekje and Goguryeo kingdoms suggest that the introduction of such images came from both Goguryeo itself as well as China. An example of the influence of the Northern Wei style is the statue now at the National Museum of Korea. This image, probably once a part of a single-mandorla triad, has robes draped in the same style as the Yong'a Buddha. However, the Baekje-specific modifications, such as the gentleness of the face, Omega-like folds in the under robe, and a sense of stability exhibited in the expansiveness of the robes as they flare out, clearly differentiate this image from those from Goguryeo.

Buddhism was officially accepted by the Silla court only in 527 or 528 although the religion was known to its people earlier due to the efforts of monks from Goguryeo in the 5th century. The late acceptance of the religion is often attributed to the geographic isolation of the kingdom, the lack of easy access to China, and the conservatism of the court. However, once Buddhism was accepted by the court, it received wholesale state sponsorship. One example of lavish state support is Hwangnyongsa, a temple which housed an approximately five-meter-tall Buddha. The statue was revered as one of the kingdom's three great treasures and was destroyed by the Mongols after surviving for 600 years. Excavations have revealed several small pieces of the Buddha, and huge foundation stones remain to testify to the great size of the statue.

=== Bodhisattva images ===
Standing bodhisattva images

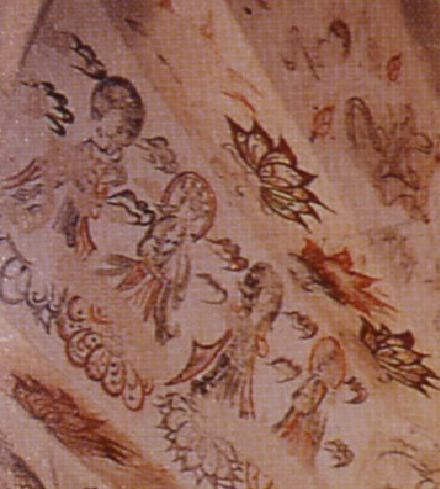
Detail of Bodhisattvas, Goguryeo Korea, late 5th century. Mural painting, eastern ceiling of main burial chamber, Jangcheon-ri Tomb No.1, Ji'an, Jilin province, China.

Bodhisattvas are beings in the Buddhist pantheon that have attained enlightenment but have opted to stay on the temporal world to help those who have not yet reached nirvana. One of the earliest depictions of a bodhisattva in Korean art is the mural painting in the Jangcheon-ri Tomb No. 1 which dates to the late 5th century. While most details are hard to see it is very clear that the figures stand atop lotus blossoms and a crucial detail that a number of early bodhisattva images have are the robes that sweep out from the sides of the figure like fishtails. Bodhisattva images of the 6th century are rarely independent figures. Most surviving images are those that were once attached as attendants to a Buddha in a single mandorla triad. Occasionally single mandorla triads were made with the bodhisattva as the main figure with two monks as attendants.

The stiffness of early Goguryeo sculpture is sometimes attributed to the harsh climate of the kingdom which was situated in northern Korea and Manchuria. The replacement of the typically elongated and lean face of Goguryeo sculpture, exemplified by the Yŏn'ga Buddha and the Standing Bodhisattva with triple head ornament shown below, with images with plump faces and gently depicted robes, exemplified by the Wono-ri Bodhisattva, may reflect the conquering of the Han River valley from Baekje in 475 or the introduction of gentler climes. These changes probably reflect, directly or indirectly, the influence of Baekje style or from Goguryeo diplomatic contacts with the southern Chinese dynasties.

The provenance of the standing Bodhisattva with triple head ornament is unknown. Based on common stylistic similarities, such as the fishtail draperies, the large hands, and the two incised lines on the chest indicating an undergarment (a southern Chinese convention) with the Yŏn'ga Buddha, most scholars believe that it is originally from Goguryeo. The Bodhisattva is only modeled in the front, another Northern Wei characteristic, and the unfinished back has several pegs. These pegs have led some scholars to believe that this Bodhisattva was once a central figure in a single-mandorla triad.

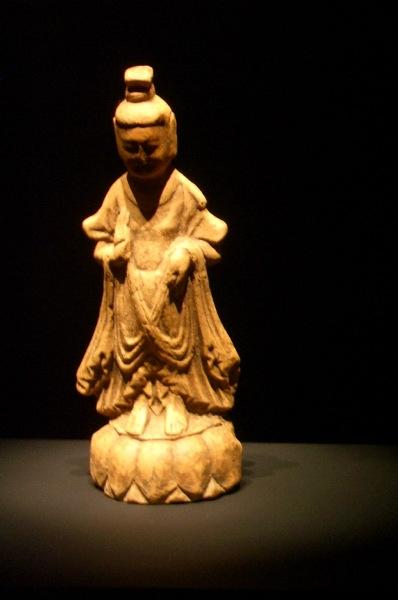
Wono-ri Bodhisattva, Goguryeo, first half of the 6th century. Ceramic, h. 17 cm. National Museum of Korea.

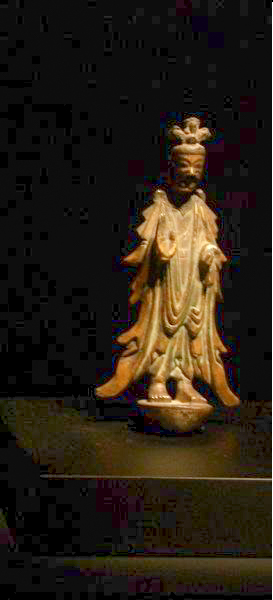
Standing Bodhisattva with triple head ornament, probably Goguryeo, mid-6th century. Gilt bronze, h. 15 cm. National Museum of Korea, Treasure No. 333.

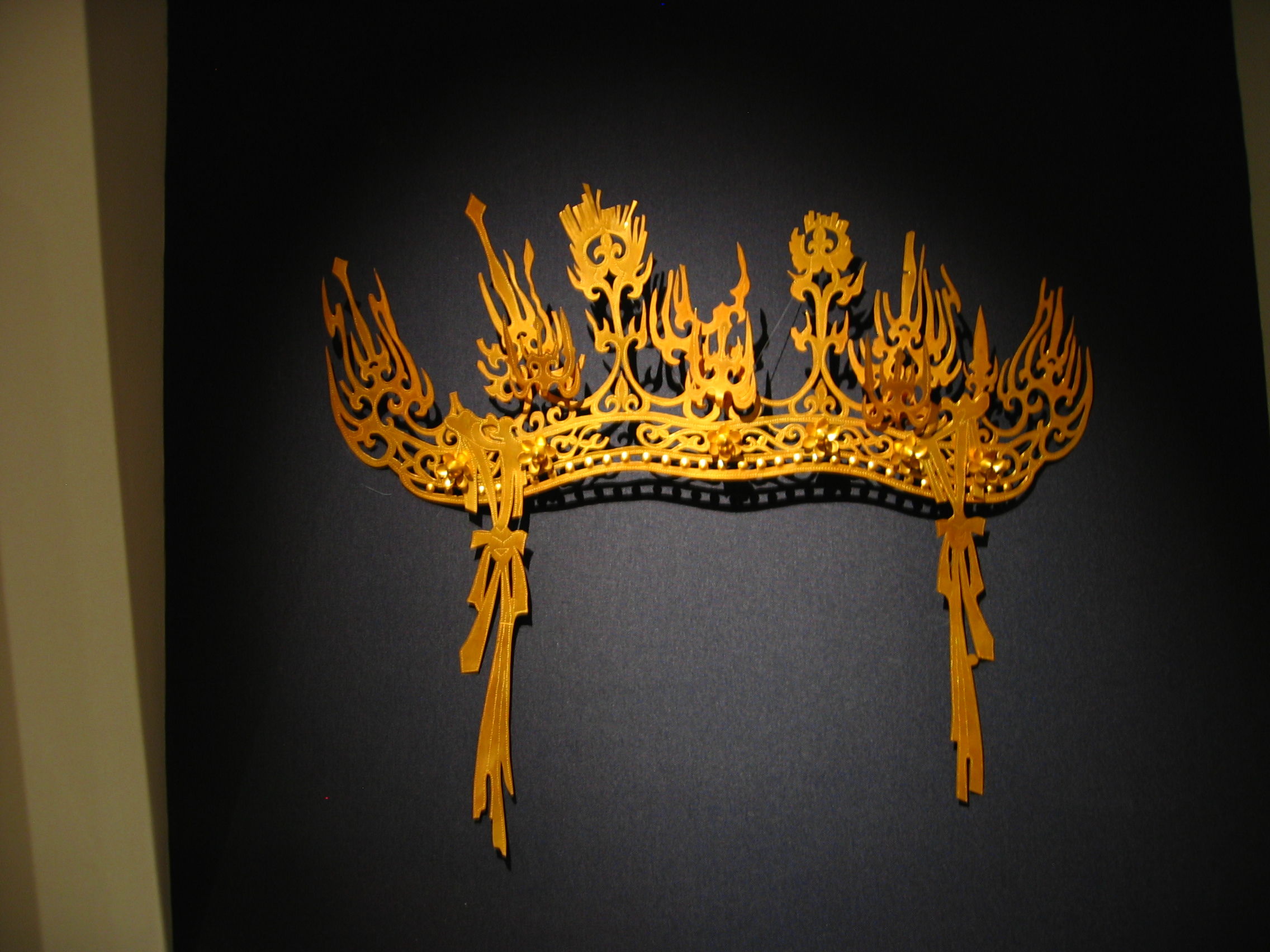
Replica of a gilt-bronze crown from Goguryeo believed to have once adorned the head of a bodhisattva image.

A standing Bodhisattva (image) now at the Buyeo National Museum was excavated from Kunsu-ri (Gunsu-ri) along with the seated Buddha. The influence of Liang dynasty art is particularly obvious in this image especially because an analogous image survives in China. The standing Kunsu-ri Bodhisattva also exhibits attributes very different from its contemporaneous Eastern Wei prototypes, such as an emphasis on the headgear and broad face and different iconographic styles employed. The smile of the image is a typical example of the famous Baekje smile commonly found on images from Baekje in both the 6th and 7th century.

Pensive bodhisattva images

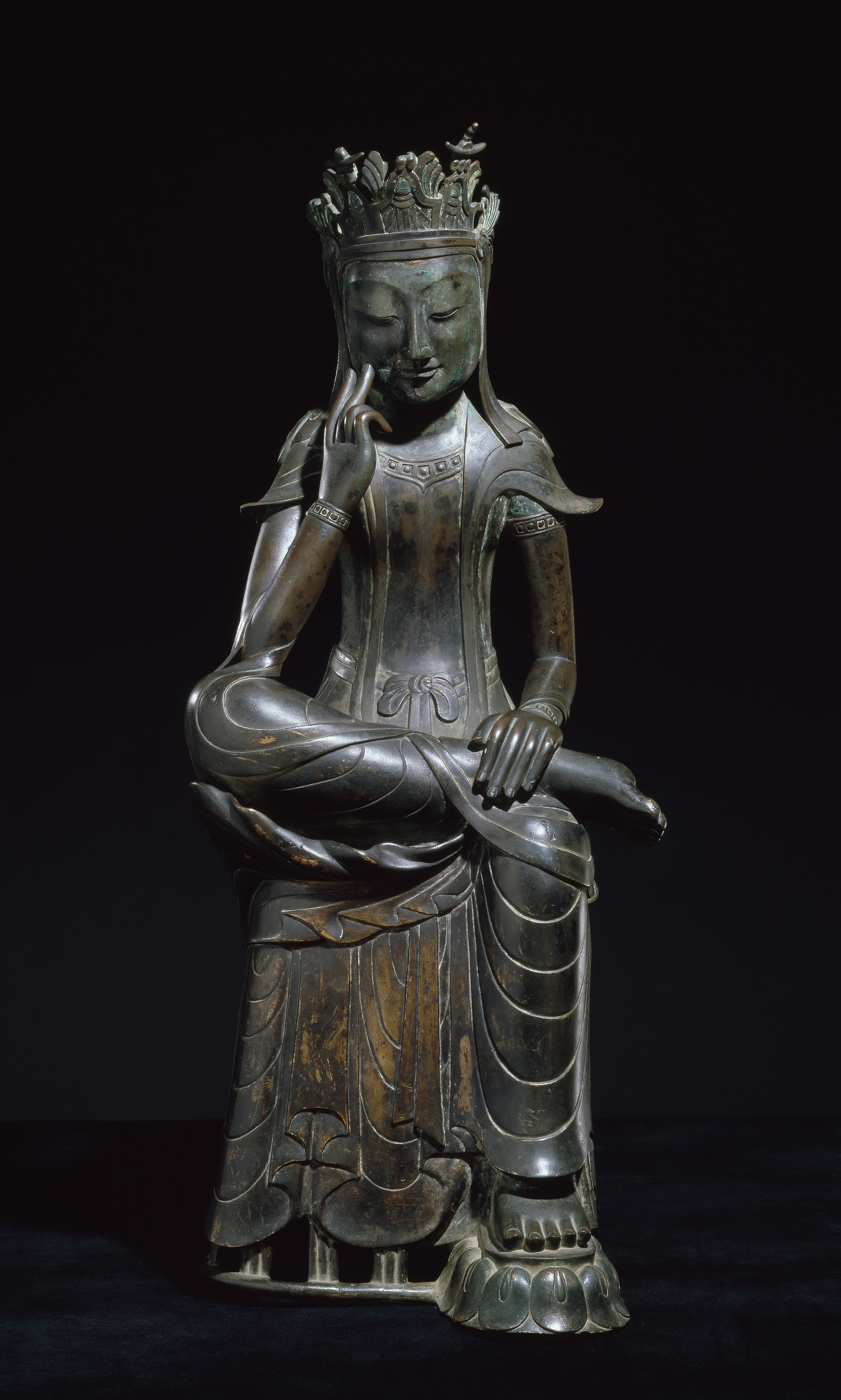
Semi-seated Bodhisattva Maitreya, second half of the 6th century, Three Kingdoms of Korea period. Gilt bronze, h. 83.2 cm. National Treasure no. 78.

While in China the pensive iconography was typically a subordinate image in a triad or was often small in size. In Korea, particularly exemplified by examples from Silla, the pensive Maitreya became a central figure of worship with several heroic-sized figures surviving. Pensive images were popular in the other two kingdoms. In early Baekje pensive statues have a characteristic parabolic drapery, a fragment of such a statue (image) is held at the Buyeo National Museum, and this style can be found in Baekje images now in Japan and Japanese images influenced by the Baekje style. A pensive image dated to the 6th century said to have been excavated in Pyongyang, now at the Ho-am Art Museum, is the only surviving example Goguryeo and is evidence that stylistic elements from the north were transmitted to Silla. Today, most surviving pensive images are from Silla.

The pensive pose involves a figure that has one leg crossed over a pendant leg, the ankle of the crossed leg rests on the knee of the pendant leg. The elbow of the figure's raised arm rests on the crossed leg's knee while the fingers rest or almost rest on the cheek of the head bent in introspection. As shown above, Prince Siddhārtha was typically depicted in a seated position in the dhyāna mudra when depicted as meditating in early Indian sculpture. A statue that can be dated to the 2nd or 3rd century in the pensive pose from Mathura, it is believed, is the prototypical example of the pensive pose. In China, bodhisattvas in the pensive pose are typically described via inscription to be the pensive prince, i.e. Prince Siddhārtha meditating. Pensive bodhisattvas in Chinese sculpture can also be seen as attendants to images in the cross-ankle seated position, a pose associated with Maitreya in China. This fact indicates that the pensive pose was not the iconography associated with Maitreya Bodhisattva.

Scholars still generally ascribe some Chinese pensive bodhisattvas to Maitreya (Kr. Mireuk) based on iconographical evidence but no inscription has ever been found to corroborate this hypothesis. Professor Junghee Lee believes a strong argument can be made for the first association of Maitreya to the pensive pose to have been formed in Korea. No pensive bodhisattva from Korea has an inscription identifying itself as Maitreya Bodhisattva as well. However, the Maitreya cult was particularly influential in Korea during the 6th and 7th centuries. The backdrop of continuous war during the Three Kingdoms period created social conditions where the Korean people were eager to look for a savior to end the war. These ideas generated unique manifestations of Maitreya worship such as the one-of-a-kind floor plan of the Mireuk Temple in Baekje and the belief that members of the elite warrior society of the Silla Kingdom's noble class were incarnations of Maitreya. Noticeably, pensive images become less popular during the early Unified Silla period and were no longer made soon thereafter. Other Korean bodhisattvas can generally identified on iconographic grounds so therefore images of the pensive pose are identified as Maitreya. The inscription of a triple mandorla triad dated to 571 also invokes the mercy of Maitreya indicating a strong hold on Korean thought.

There are several examples of the pensive image made in Korea that survive. One example (image) which has come under debate as to its origins (either Goguryeo or Northern Wei) is believed to be one of two attendants to a central figure and closely follows the Northern Wei style. A stone fragment from Mt. Puso (image) in former Baekje territory is indicative of the acceptance of depicting the body narrowly and is an early example of the depiction of frontal folds in concentric circles. This folding schematic can be seen in later pensive images as well. Another example of a pensive Maitreya from the 6th century is an item (image) now held at the Tokyo National Museum which is generally accepted to be from 6th century Korea.

A major monument of Korean Buddhist sculpture, National Treasure no. 78, is usually dated to the late 6th century. The figure incorporates the style of the Eastern Wei. Although the style employed is archaic, X-ray studies of the statue, suggests that it is the younger of the two because of the sophistication of the casting, the bronze being no thicker than one centimeter, the rarity of air bubbles, and the high quality metal. Some scholars have used the evidence of the x-ray photos to suggest a later date for the treasure. Generally, scholars believe that the image was cast in Silla based on the fact that there were several anecdotal stories stating that the Japanese man who rediscovered the image had found them in the ruins of a temple in what was once Silla. Professor Woo-bang Kang has argued that the statue was made in Goguryeo, who he believes was the only state technologically capable of casting the image, and was at one point brought to the south. National Treasure no. 78 could also be a Baekje image because the Baekje kingdom probably had sufficient casting expertise by the late 6th century and several bodhisattva images associated with Baekje, particularly one in the collection of the Tokyo National Museum (image), bear stylistic resemblances to the treasure.

Northern Wei Maitreya Bodhisattva from the early 6th century with ankles crossed, the pose most commonly used to identify Maitreya Bodhisattva in China during this time period.

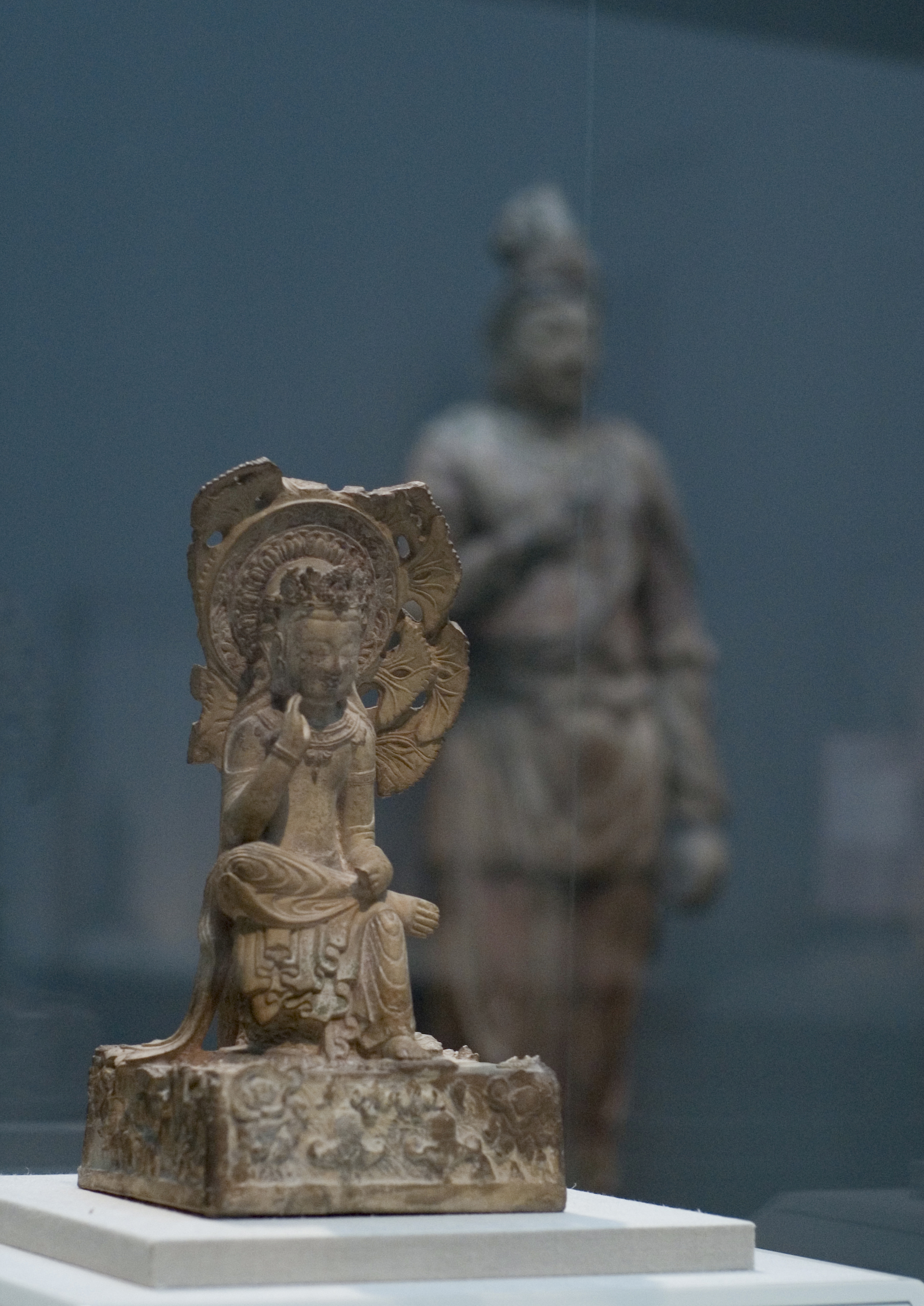
Pensive Bodhisattva, Northern Qi (550-577). Marble, c. 575. Freer Gallery of Art, Smithsonian Institution, Washington D.C.

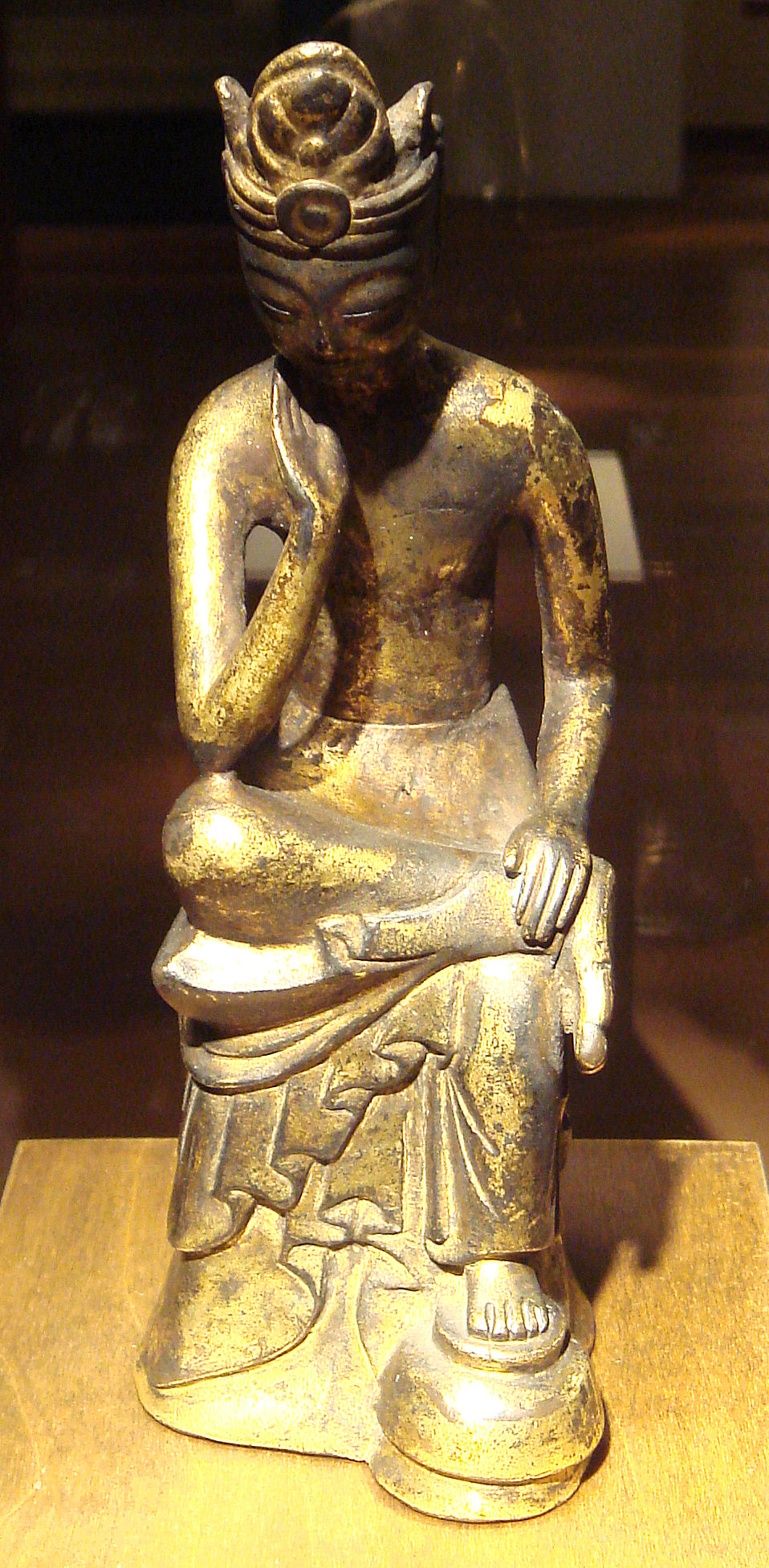
Pensive Bodhisattva Maitreya, Baekje, late 6th century. Gilt bronze, H. 5.5 cm; L.: 5.5

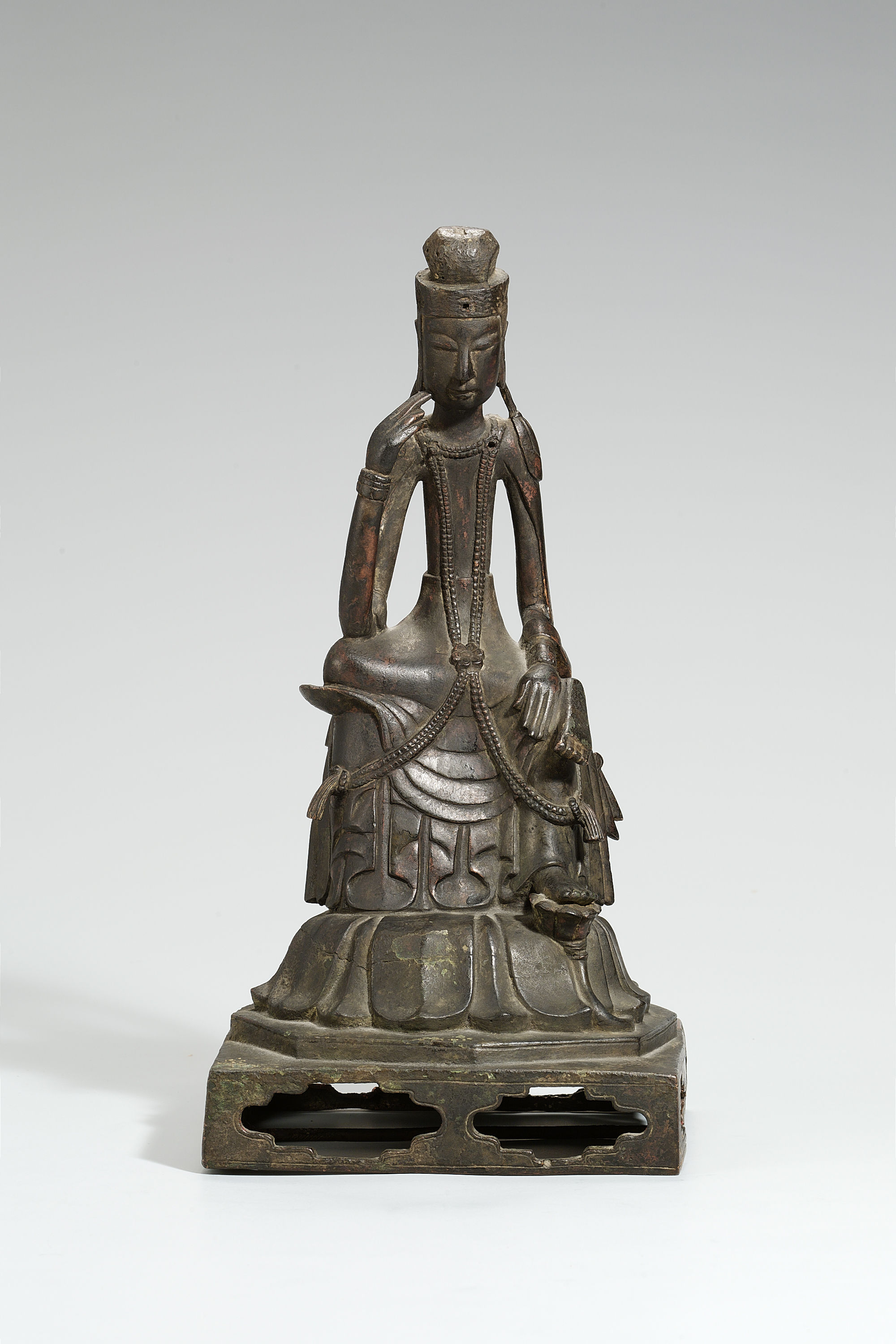
Pensive Bodhisattva Maitreya, Silla, 6th century. Gilt bronze, h. 28.5 cm. National Museum of Korea, Treasure no. 331.

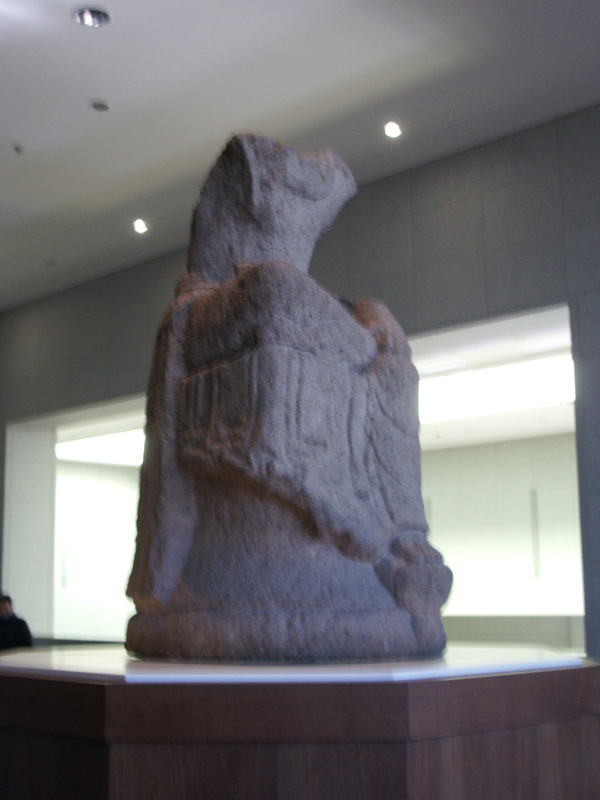

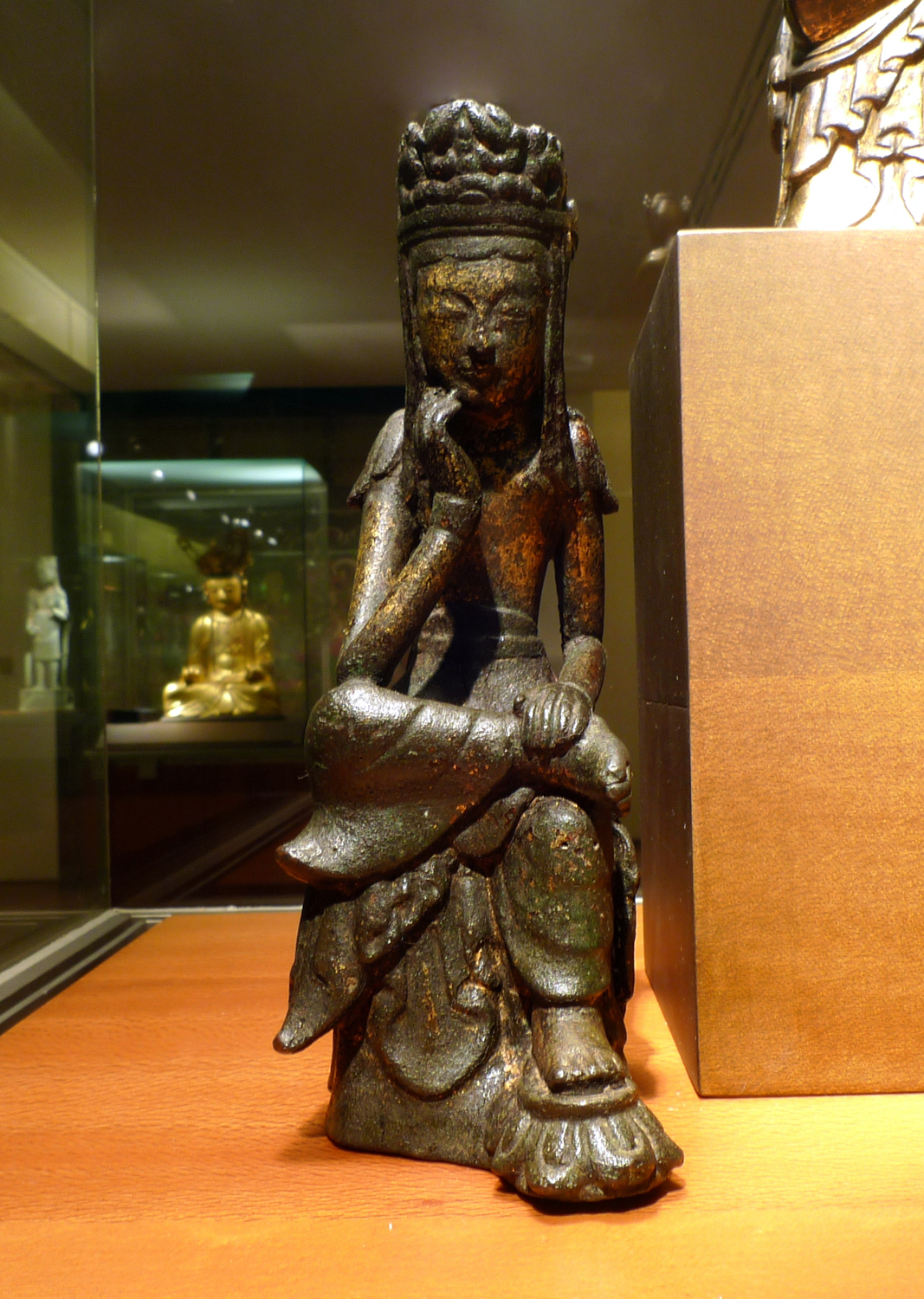
6th or 7th century.

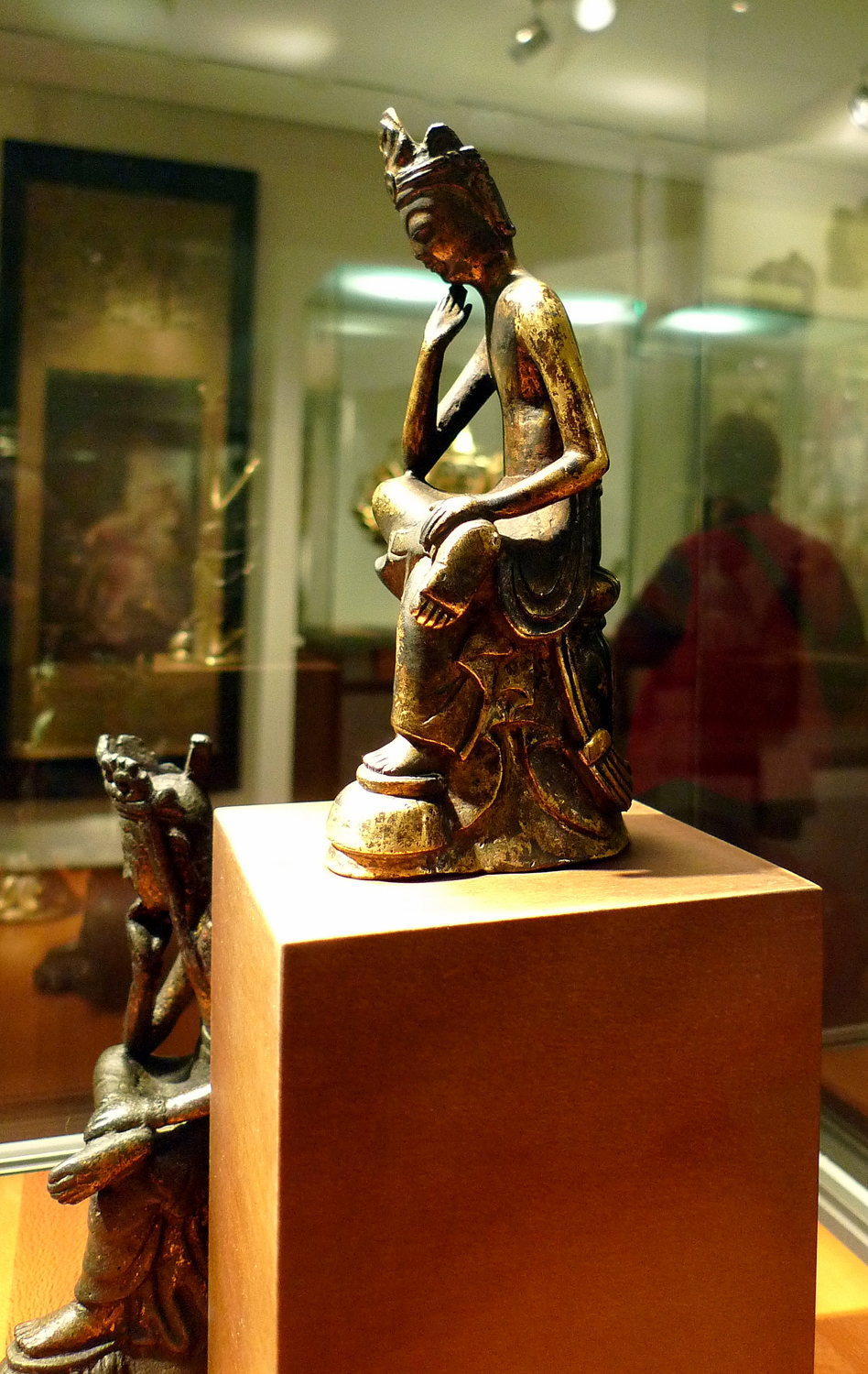
6th century, Baekje.

=== Korean influence in early Japanese sculpture ===
The Baekje kingdom's style was particularly influential in the initial stages of Asuka sculpture. It was in 552 that King Seong of Baekje sent a gilt bronze image of Sakyumuni to Yamato Japan according to the Nihon shoki. Most scholars, based on other Japanese records, consider a 538 date to be more accurate. While it is impossible to know what this first Buddha in Japan looked like, an image similar to the Yong'a Buddha, contemporaneous because it is dated to 539, leads some scholars to speculate that King Seong's proselytizing image looked similar to it. Another Japanese source, the Gangōji Garan Engi, however, identifies the image as the "prince." This suggests that the initial image was the prince Siddhārtha in the pensive pose on the verge of enlightenment, an iconography popular in China. Images in the pensive pose are almost always associated with Maitreya in Korea. However, another iconography associated with the prince Siddhārtha is the Buddha at birth. Since this source also lists items for a lustration ceremony some scholars believe that the image was of the infant Buddha. Although Buddhism was introduced into Yamato Japan at a relatively early period, it was not until the 7th century that the pro-Buddhist Soga clan succeeded in eliminating its rivals to allow Buddhism enjoy the support of the central polity.

A passage in the Nihon Shoki states that in 577 King Wideok of Baekje sent to the Yamato polity another Buddhist image, a temple architect, and a maker of images. The passage clearly indicates that the Japanese still needed Korean artisans skilled in metal casting techniques and knowledgeable about specific iconography to construct images. In 584, a stone statue of Maitreya and another image simply identified as a Buddha by the Nihon Shoki were sent as part of a diplomatic exchange and are the last official, royally commissioned Baekje images recorded to be sent to Japan in the 6th century. Such exchanges, both official and unofficial, were integral in establishing early Japanese Buddhist sculpture.

Many extant Baekje sculpture survive in Japan today. Horyu-ji Treasure no. 151 (image) is accepted by virtually all Japanese authorities to be of Korean origin and was brought to Japan in the middle 6th century. The four rectangular cavities in the back of the statue is a trait far more common in Korean than Japanese sculpture. The image was probably used as a private devotional icon brought by Korean settlers. Hōryū-ji Treasure no. 158 (image), a pensive image is another image generally considered by Japanese scholars to be from Korea and is dated on stylistic grounds to the mid-6th century. The Funagatayamajinja Bodhisattva, probably once part of a triad, has a crown with three flowers which was common early Three Kingdoms sculpture but not extant in Asuka sculpture. The image is believed to have originated in Korea.

Hōryū-ji Treasure no. 196 (image) is a mandorla for a triad that was made in Korea and can be arguably dated to the late 6th century, 594. The triad's inscription contains phrases very similar to two Paekche pieces, a Puyo triad (image) and a mandorla once part of a triad dated to 596 (image ). This mandorla incorporates the typical features found in older Korean-style triads, including the odd number of Buddhas of the Past, the floral scroll inside the inner halo, and the jewel found at the apex of the head halo.

== Three Kingdoms period, 7th century ==
=== Buddha images ===
Standing Buddha images

Standing Buddha images of the 7th century in Korea were influenced by the art of the Northern Qi, Sui, and Tang polities in China. Additionally, there are Korean images from the 7th century with unique attributes not found elsewhere, suggesting local innovations in Buddhist iconography. Unfortunately, no Goguryeo sculpture from the 7th century has survived or has yet been discovered. Two pieces that have been attributed to the Korean and Mohe Balhae state may actually be from Goguryeo. The frontal focused images give way to a more three-dimensional rounded look.

An image type unique to the Silla Kingdom, and not found in Paekche, Goguryeo, China, or Japan, is a standing Buddha at the National Museum of Korea. The face is childlike and calm, the ushnisha is large and virtually indistinguishable from the head. The robe is worn on one shoulder, a style popular in India, and the image holds a jewel or lotus blossom in one outstretched hand. Another type of image is the image of Buddha at birth. These images show Buddha naked except for a ceremonial cloth around the waist. A type of iconography found in China or Japan is the baby Buddha pointing one arm in the air and another to the earth which illustrates that nothing in the heaven or earth was like the Buddha. This iconography is believed to have originated in Korea and was influential in Japan were later images are plentiful. Sillan figures continue to show the influence of Northern Qi style in the 7th century. This can be seen in the tall columnar Buddha and a childlike Buddha which has multiple similarities to recently discovered Buddha sculptures from Longxingsi, Shandong in China. The childlike Buddha shows typical Sillan sculptural traits that are often found in stone work, namely the large head and youthful, innocent air of the Buddha. Additionally, the iconographic details of the statue, not found in Chinese sculpture, suggests that Silla had direct contact with artists from southern India and Sri Lanka. Ancient records also support this suggestion because several foreign monks were said to have resided in Hwangnyongsa translating Buddhist sutras and texts. Pensive figures also continued to be popular.

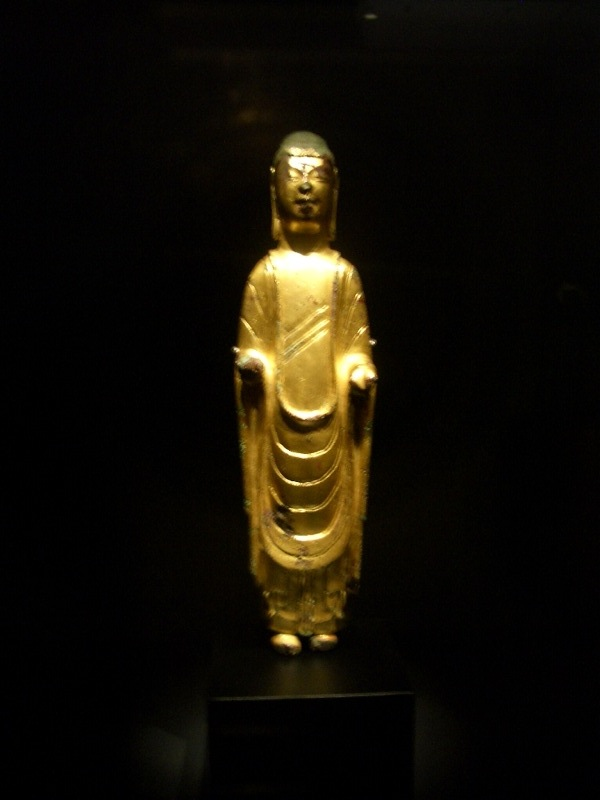
Yangp'yong Buddha, Silla, second half of the 6th century or first half of the 7th century. Gilt bronze, h. 30 cm. National Museum of Korea, National Treasure no. 186.

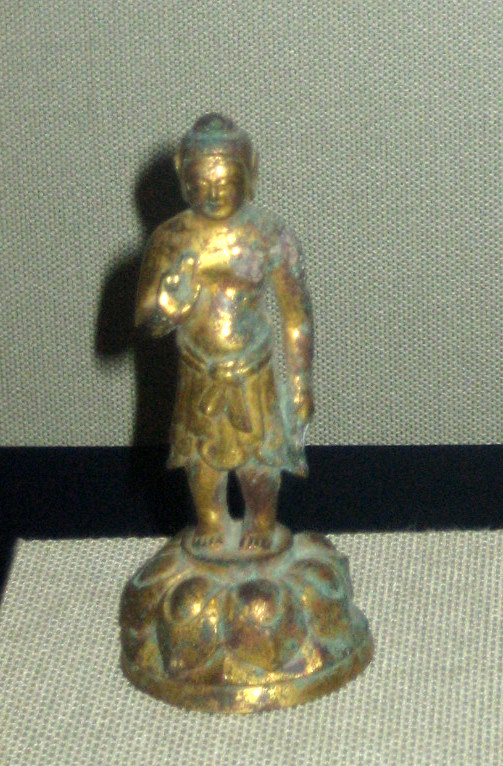
Standing Infant Buddha, Three Kingdoms period, first half of 7th c. Gilt bronze, h. 10.7 cm. Gyeongju National Museum.

Single mandorla triads

=== Bodhisattva images ===
Standing bodhisattva images

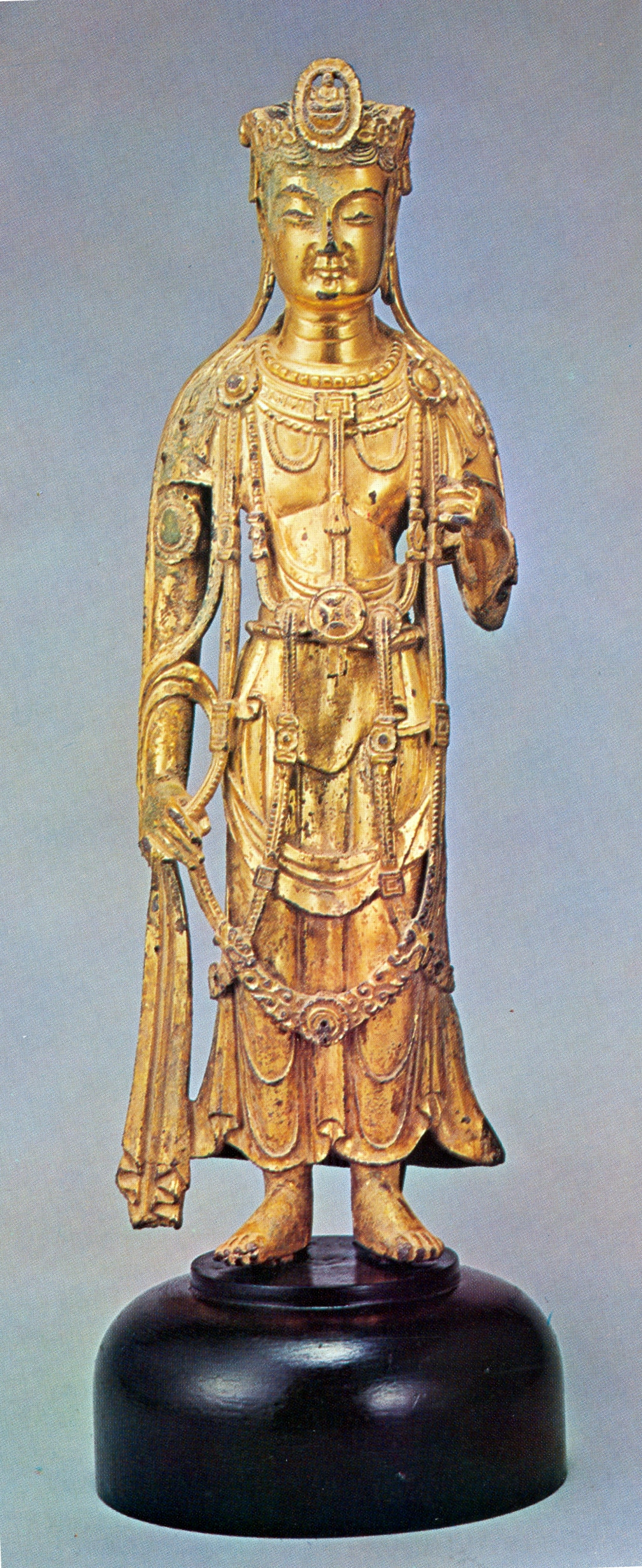
Standing Gilt-bronze Bodhisattva from Seonsan-eup in Gumi, first half of 7th century Three Kingdoms period, Daegu National Museum

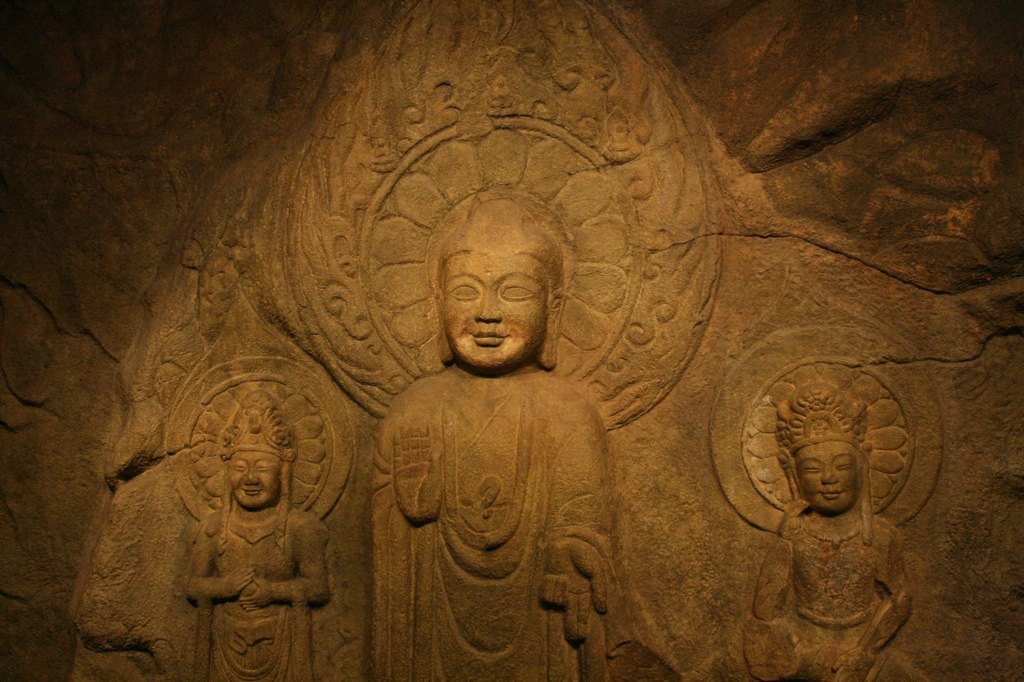
Sosan Buddha Triad, Baekje 7th century. H. of Buddha 2.8 meters, of Bodhisattva 1.7 m., of seated Maitreya 1.66 m. Yonghyon-ri, Unsan-myon, Sosan-gun, South Ch'ungch'ong Province. National Treasure no. 84.

The 7th century can be said to be a time of maturity for Korean Buddhist sculptures because of the fine statuettes that have been discovered and preserved. As discussed above, standing bodhisattva images from the 6th century generally follow the Northern and Eastern Wei stylistic traditions such as the long crossed scarves and the swooping scalloped curves of the robes to the sides of images. During the second half of the 6th century, northern China was ruled by the Northern Qi and then the Northern Zhou until the Sui dynasty successfully ended the Southern and Northern dynasties period in 581. The styles of these three regimes can be seen in contemporaneous Korean sculpture and were influential in Korean sculpture of the 7th century as well.

The style of the regimes that succeeded the Eastern Wei regime emphasized the human form more fully. Instead of focusing only on the frontal aspects of an image, Northern Qi sculptors emphasized the whole body creating images that had a cylindrical shape. Increased realism of Northern Qi statuary can also be seen in the details of robes, jewelry, and a new emphasis on movement with the tribanga or thrice-bent pose.

A Korean example of these trends can be seen in a bodhisattva in the collection of the Gyeongju National Museum. The bodhisattva is in the tribanga pose.

Pensive images

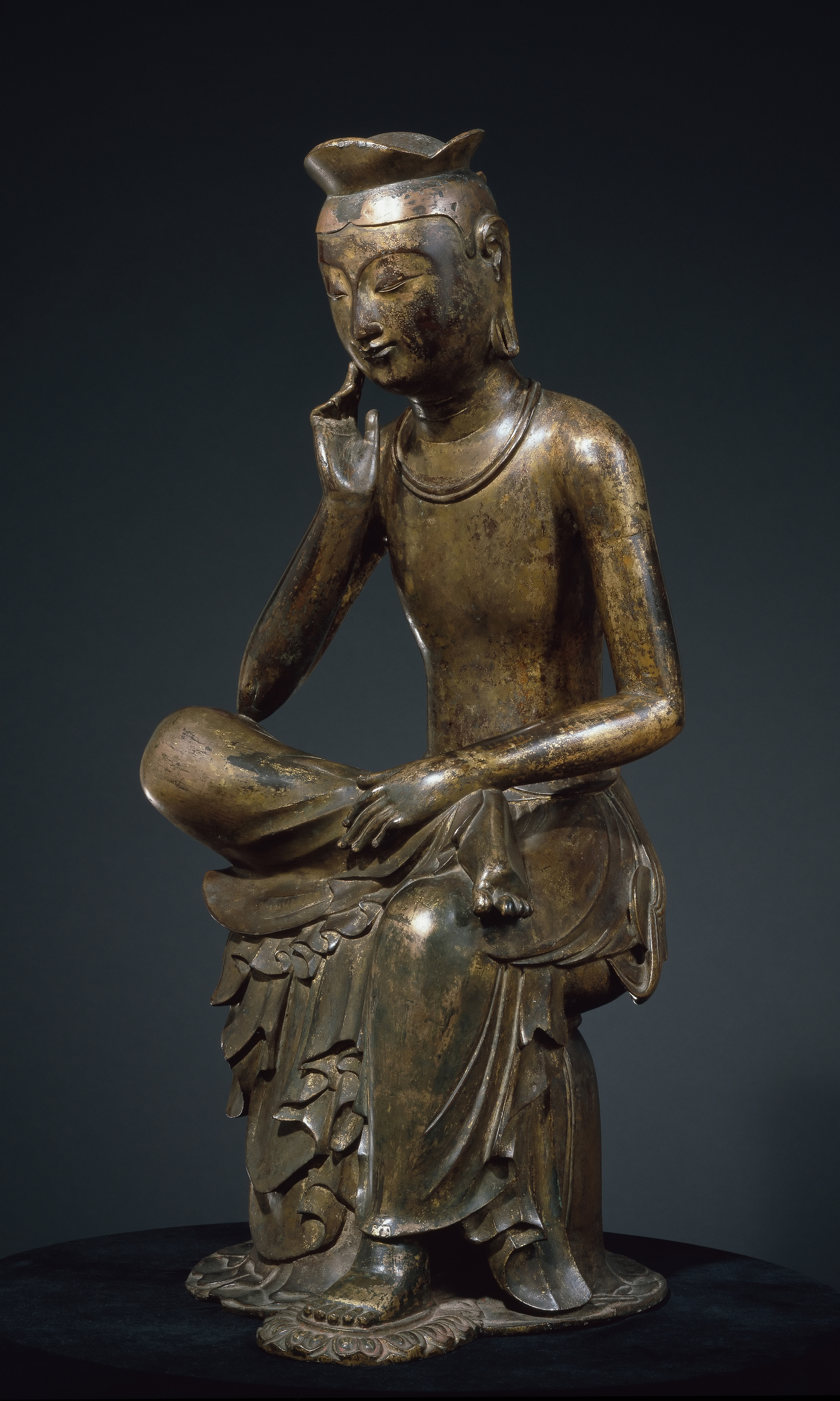
Pensive Bodhisattva Maitreya, National Treasure no. 83. National Museum of Korea.

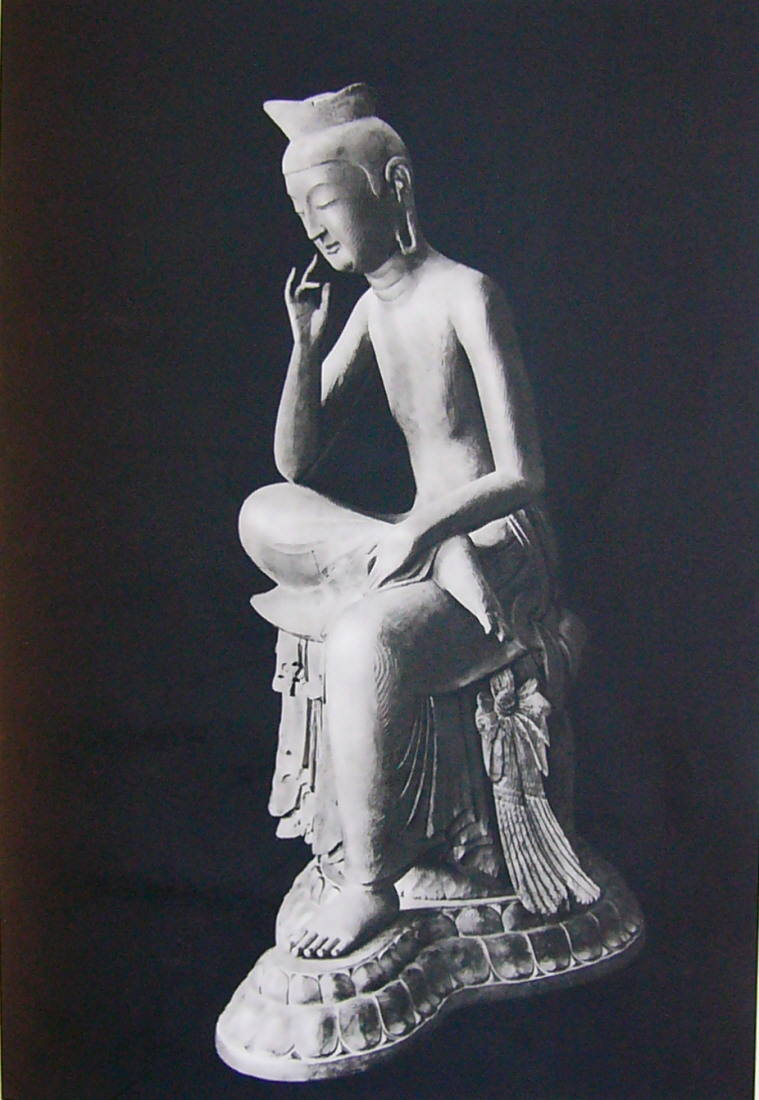
Pensive Bodhisattva Maitreya probably from Silla Korea, a National Treasure of Japan. Kōryū-ji, Japan.

In Korea, the technically difficult pensive posture was adapted by all three kingdoms and transformed into a particularly Korean style.

The cult of Maitreya was particularly influential in the 6th and 7th centuries of the Three Kingdoms period. Sillan kings styled themselves as rulers of a Buddha land, the King symbolizing the Buddha. This religious adaptation is also exemplified in the Hwarang corp, a group of aristocratic youth who were groomed for leadership in the endless wars on the peninsula. The leader of the Hwarang was believed to be the incarnation of Maitreya, a uniquely Korean adaptation of the religion. Maitreya, it was believed, would ascend to earth as the future Buddha in 56 million years and this believe was incorporated into Silla's desire to unite the peninsula. Japanese records also suggest that Sillan images given to the Sillan Hata Clan are the current Koryo-ji Miroku Bosatsu and the Naki Miroku. The Koryu-ji Miroku, dated to 620–640, is stylistically a Korean image, is made from red pine which is indigenous to Korea, and the technique of carving inward from a single log is a believed to be an ancient Korean wood-working technique. The Korean cult of Maitreya, and the major influence of Korean-style pensive images on Japan in the Asuka period. Korean influence on Japanese Buddhist art was very strong during 552–710.

National Treasure no. 83 is an example of the Korean style from the early 7th century. The figure is said to have been found in Silla territory and is dated to the late 6th or early 7th century. It was probably commissioned by the royal family.

National Treasure no. 83, exhibiting stylistic influence from Northern Qi, for a time, was believed to be from Baekje. However, recent research strongly suggests, based on numerous pieces of evidence, suggests that the statue was produced in Silla and scholarly consensus seems to agree on that point. A similar stone pensive statue found in Silla territory and a head with a similar crown excavated at Hwangnyongsa indicates an origin in Silla. National Treasure no. 83 is also important because it illustrates the close connection between Korea and Japan during this period. Koryu-ji's almost identical Miroku Bosatsu (Maitreya Bodhisattva) (image), a national treasure of Japan, is now believed to be of Silla manufacture because of the use of red pine, a wood used for Korean sculpture, ancient Japanese records, and the use of Korean carving techniques.

National Treasure no. 83

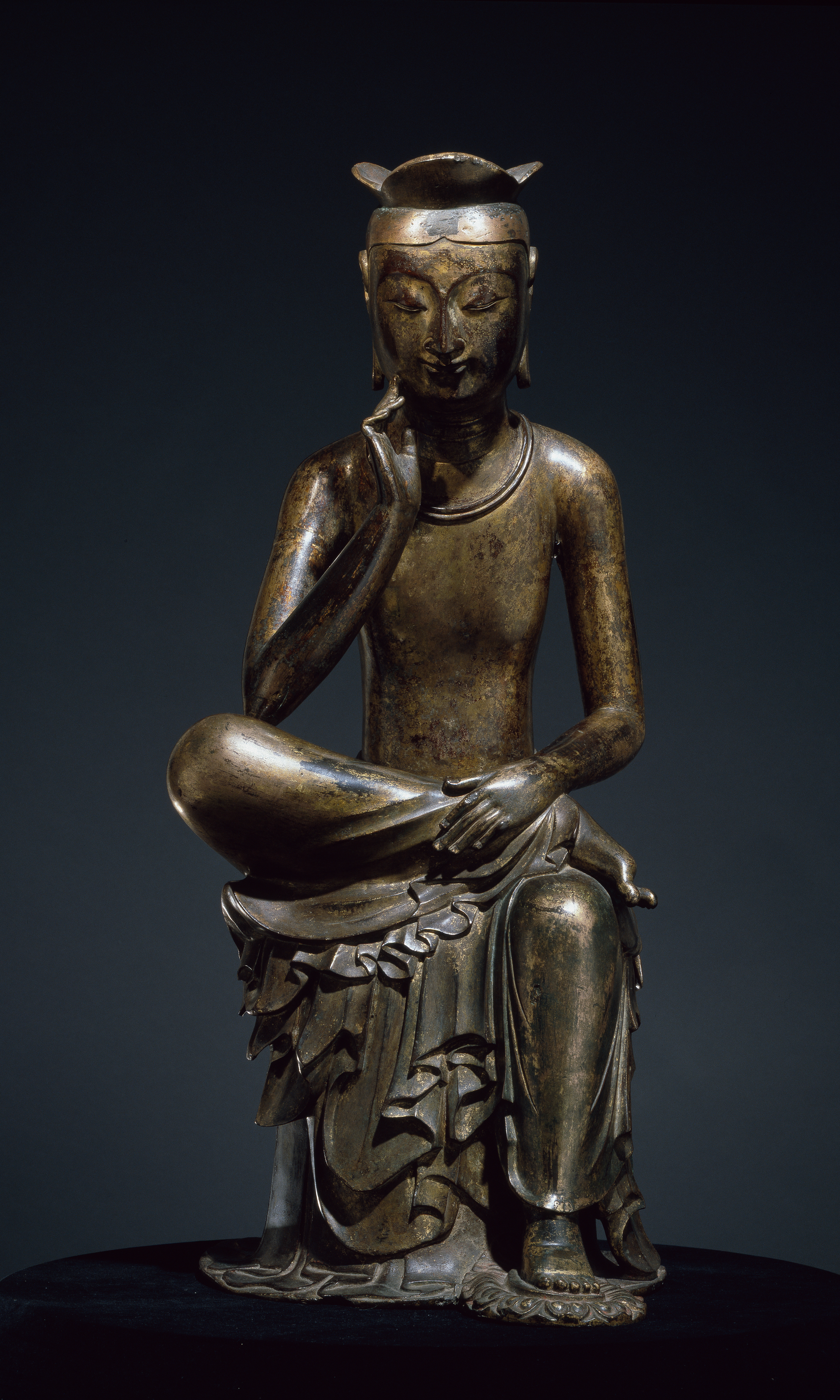
Pensive Bodhisattva Maitreya, Silla, late 6th or early 7th century. Gilt bronze, h. 93.5 cm. National Treasure no. 83. National Museum of Korea.

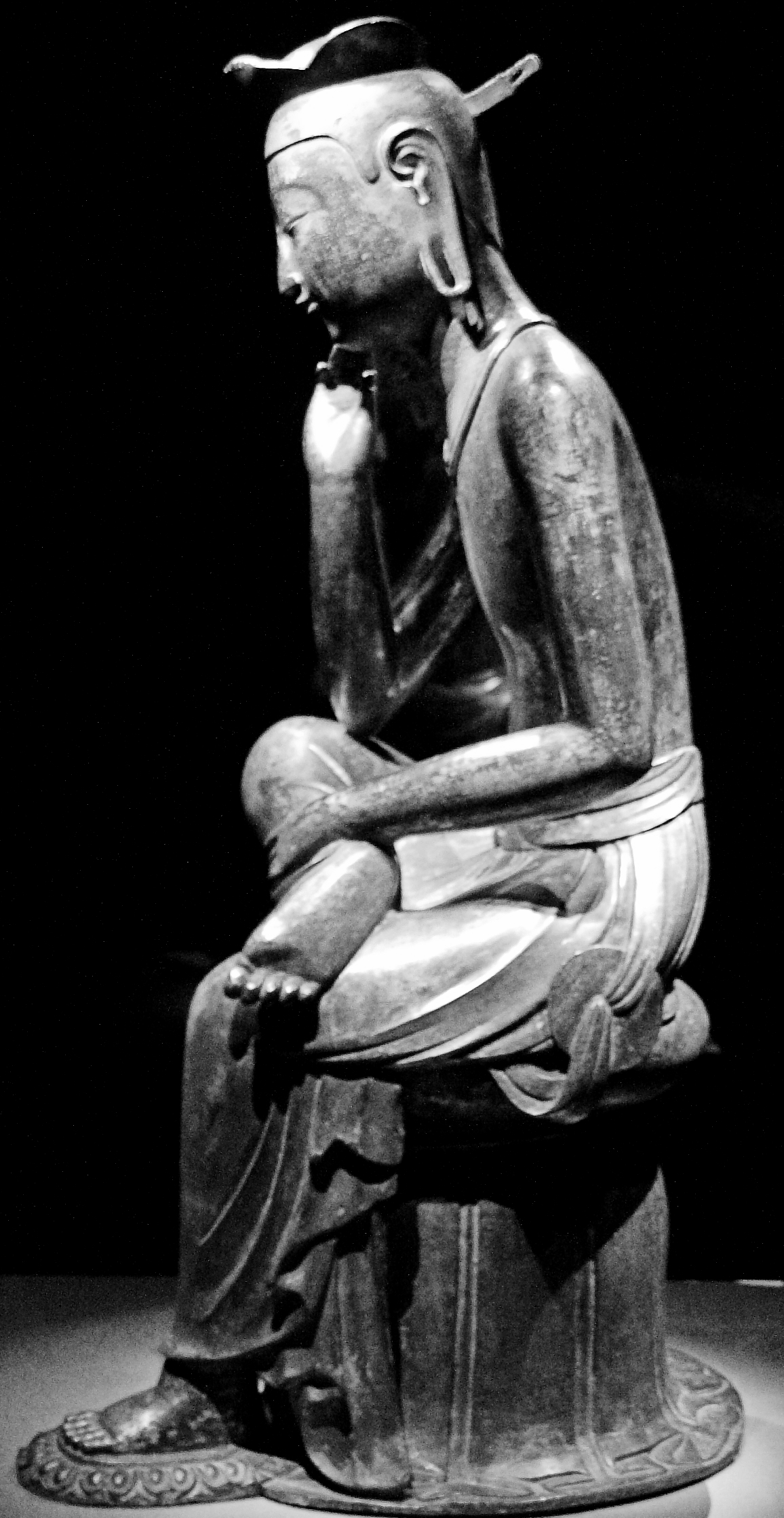
Side view of the Semi-seated Bodhisattva Maitreya.

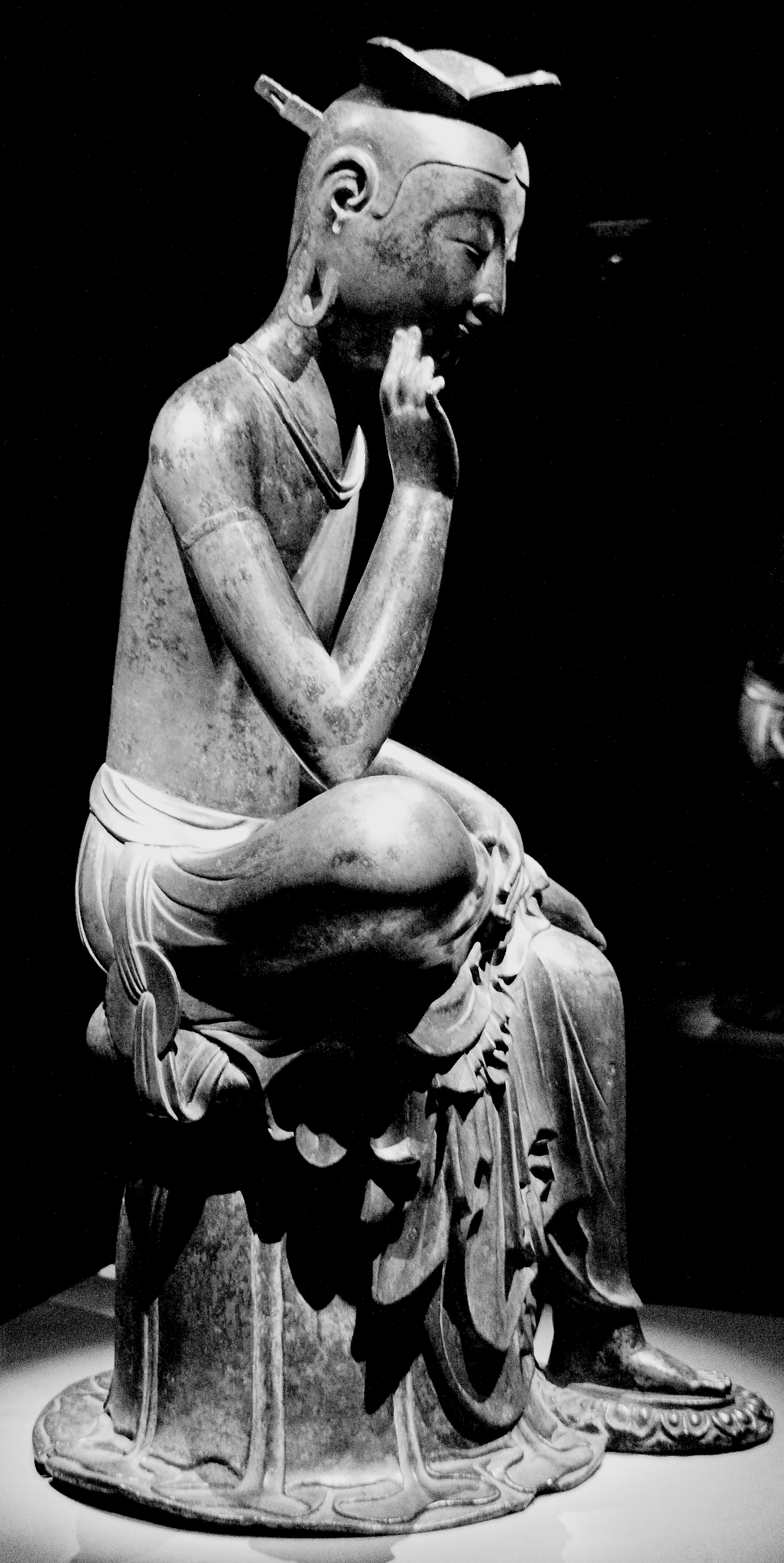

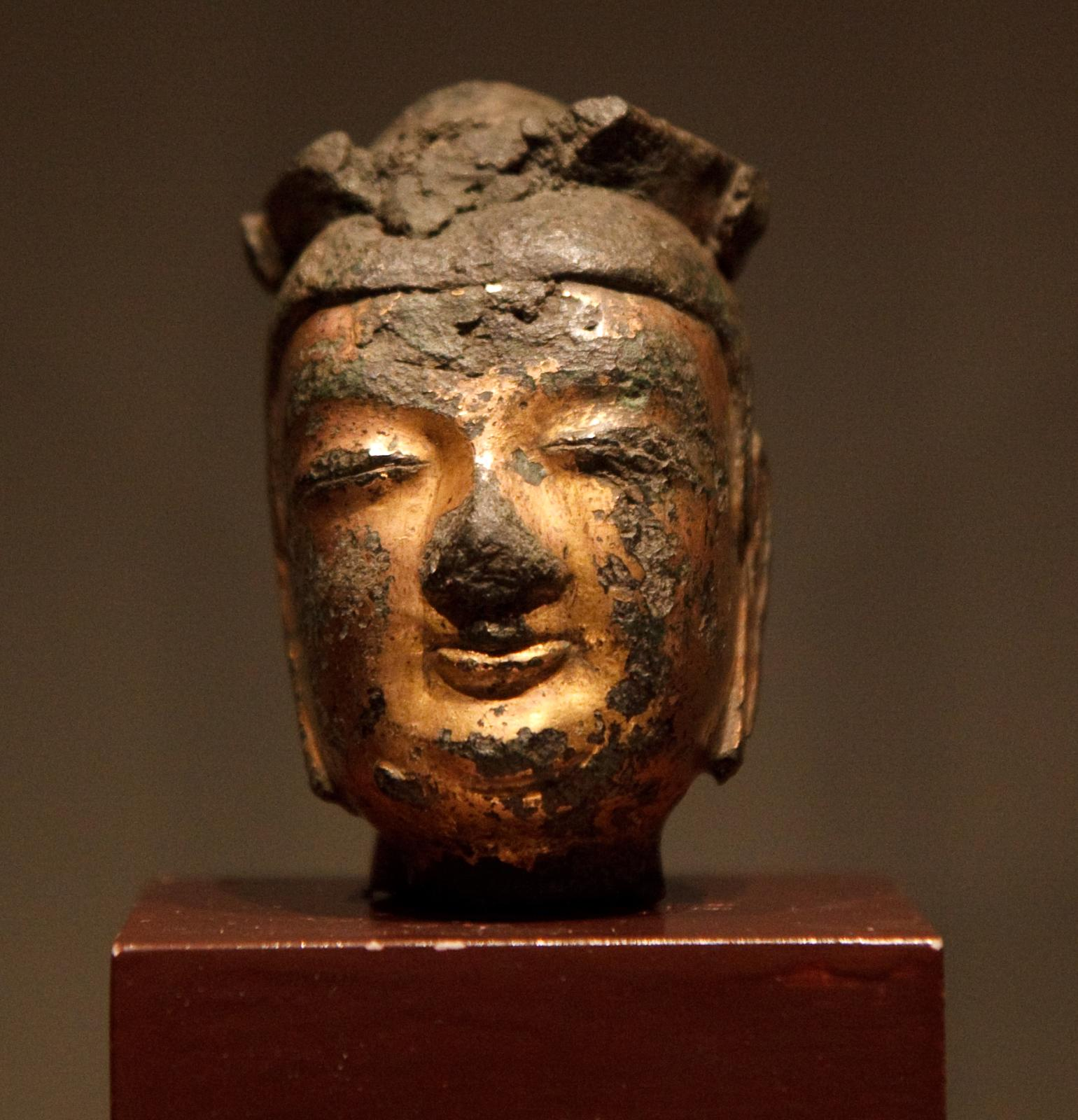
Fragment of a bodhisattva excavated from Hwangnyong Temple with marked similarities with National Treasure no. 83.

A later pensive image, now at the Metropolitan Museum of Art is a particularly fine example of Baekje sculpture dated to the 7th century. A chronologically contemporaneous figure from 7th century Japan shows the influence of the Baekje style specifically in the handling of the torso, the triple upright crown, and the locks of hair falling over the shoulder. The example at the Metropolitan Museum can be dated to the mid-7th century based on the shape of the stool on which it sits (unseen here) and the removal of a stylized piece of cloth that most pensive images rest their crossed leg upon which is seen in earlier images. Another important Baekje pensive image: (image).

While bronze statues from the Three Kingdoms period are rare, pensive bodhisattvas are relatively numerous. Most have been excavated in the southeastern portion of Korea so most scholars believe they were cast in Silla. Examples from the 7th century are usually well-proportioned and developed, artisans having mastered the complicated techniques to craft pensive images. The first example below shows a particularly beautiful example while the second example shows an image where the head of the bodhisattva lowered very deeply in thought. Although these examples follow National Treasure no. 83 or some unknown prototype by conveying a bare chested portrayal of Maitreya, no two Korean pensive image has been shown to be identical indicating that different masters creatively interpreted their portrayal of religious imagery. Since Maitreya was viewed as a messianic figure, the absence of Maitreya iconography absent from later Unified Silla art suggests the cult lost favor as Korea was mostly united under one government and peace returned.

Pensive images from Baekje, Yamato, and Silla

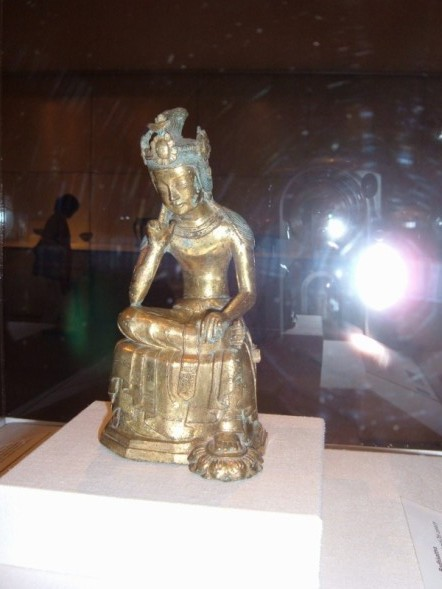
Semi-seated Bodhisattva Maitreya, Baekje, mid-7th century. Gilt bronze. Metropolitan Museum of Art.

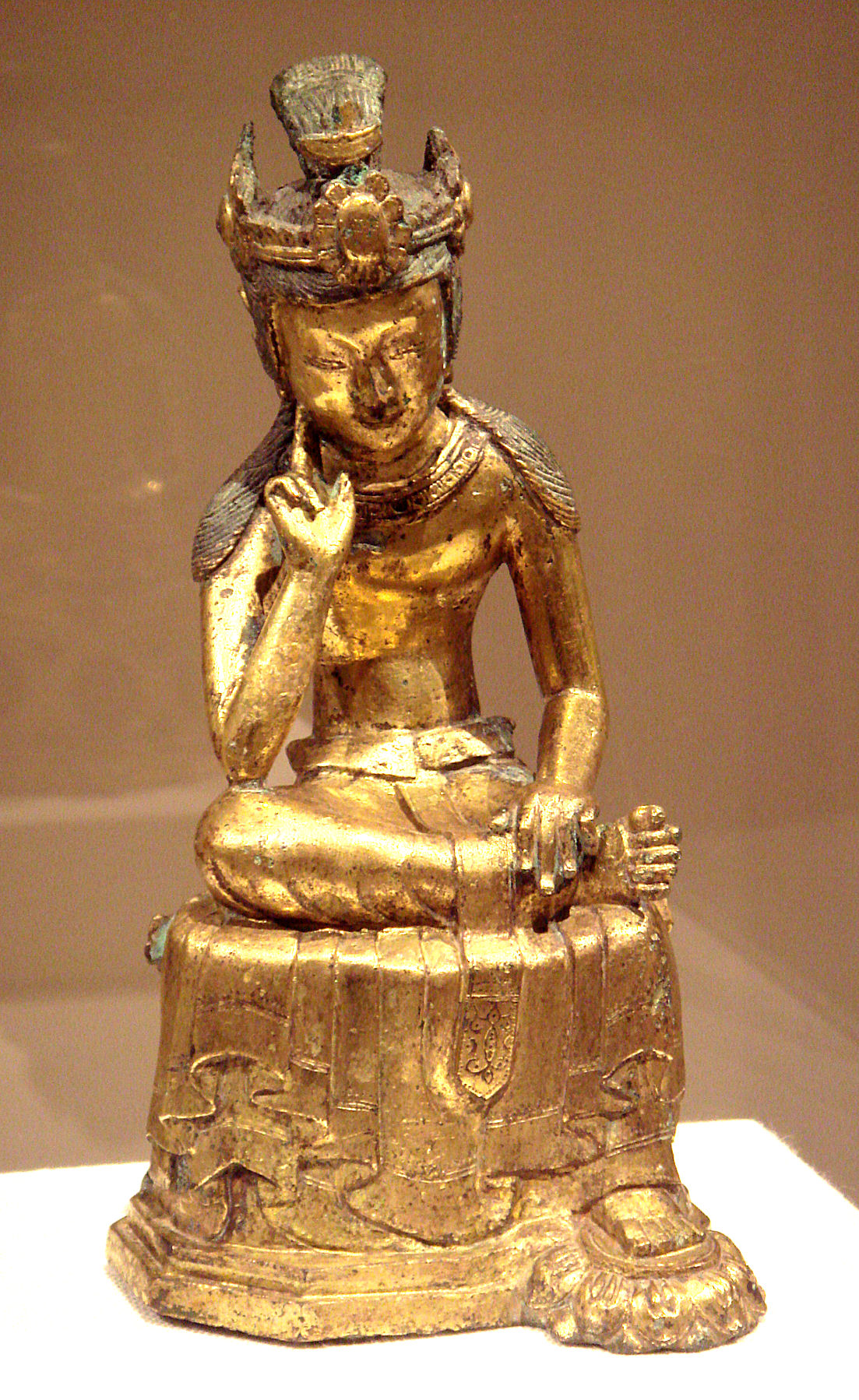

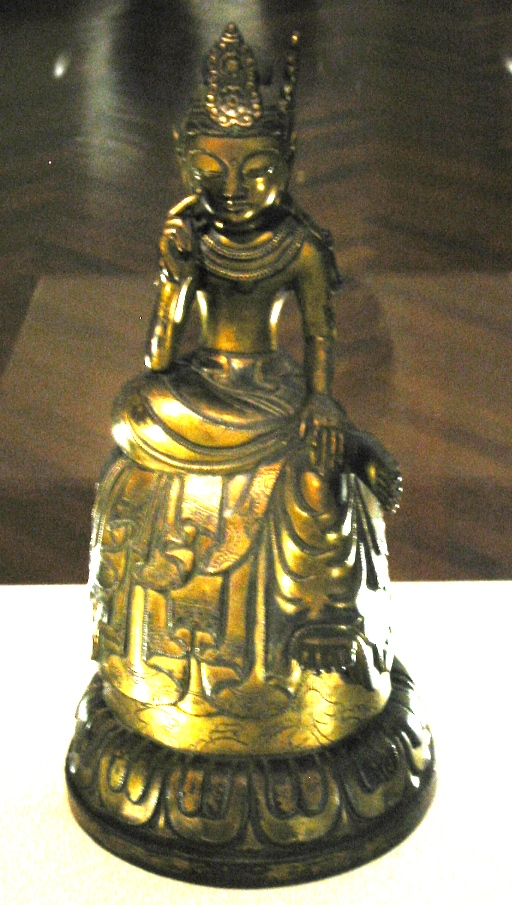
Semi-seated Bodhisattva Maitreya, Asuka Japan, 7th century. Gilt bronze. Tokyo National Museum.

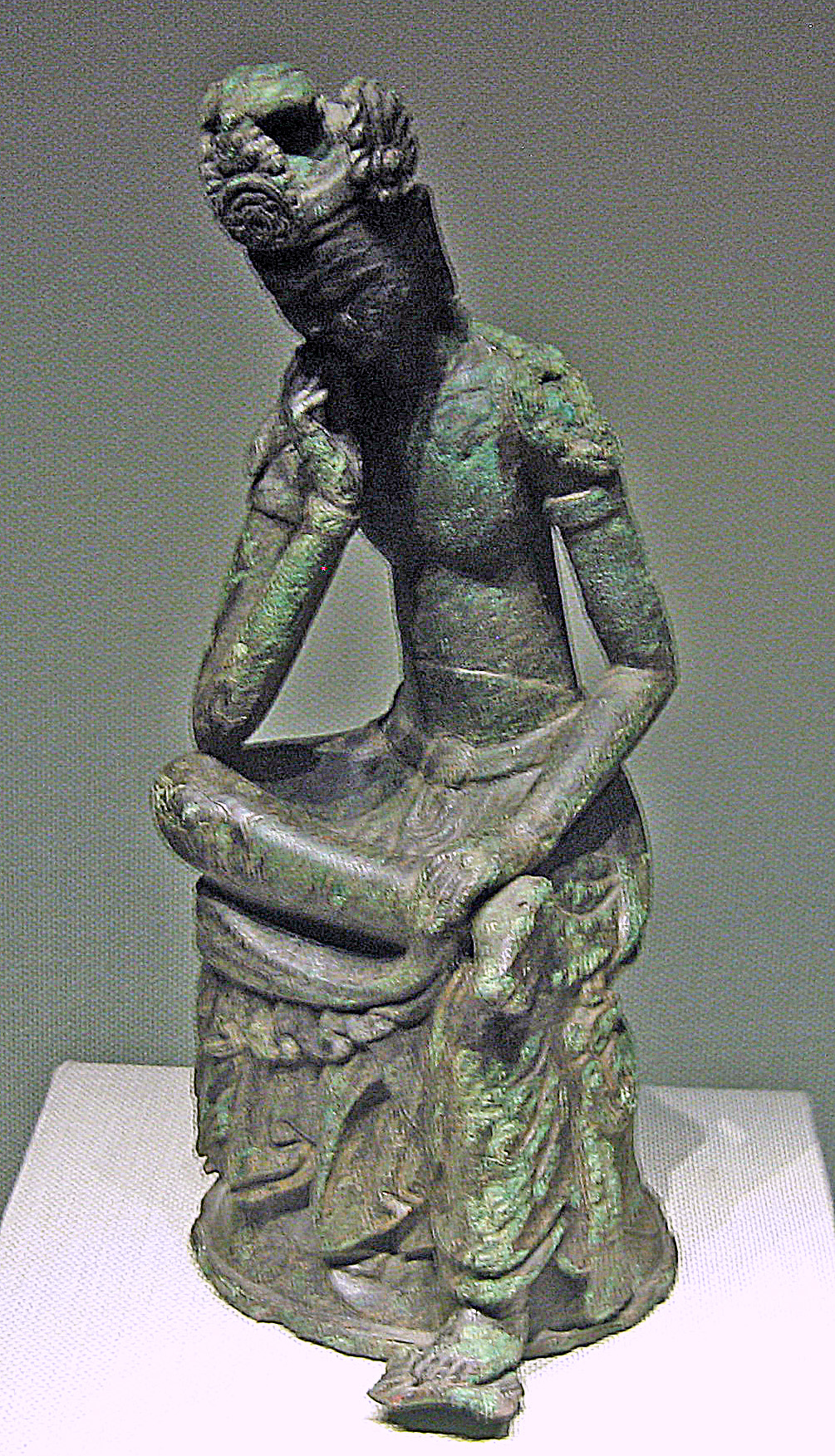
Semi-seated Bodhisattva Maitreya, Silla, first half of 7th century. Gilt bronze, h. 27.5 cm. National Museum of Korea.

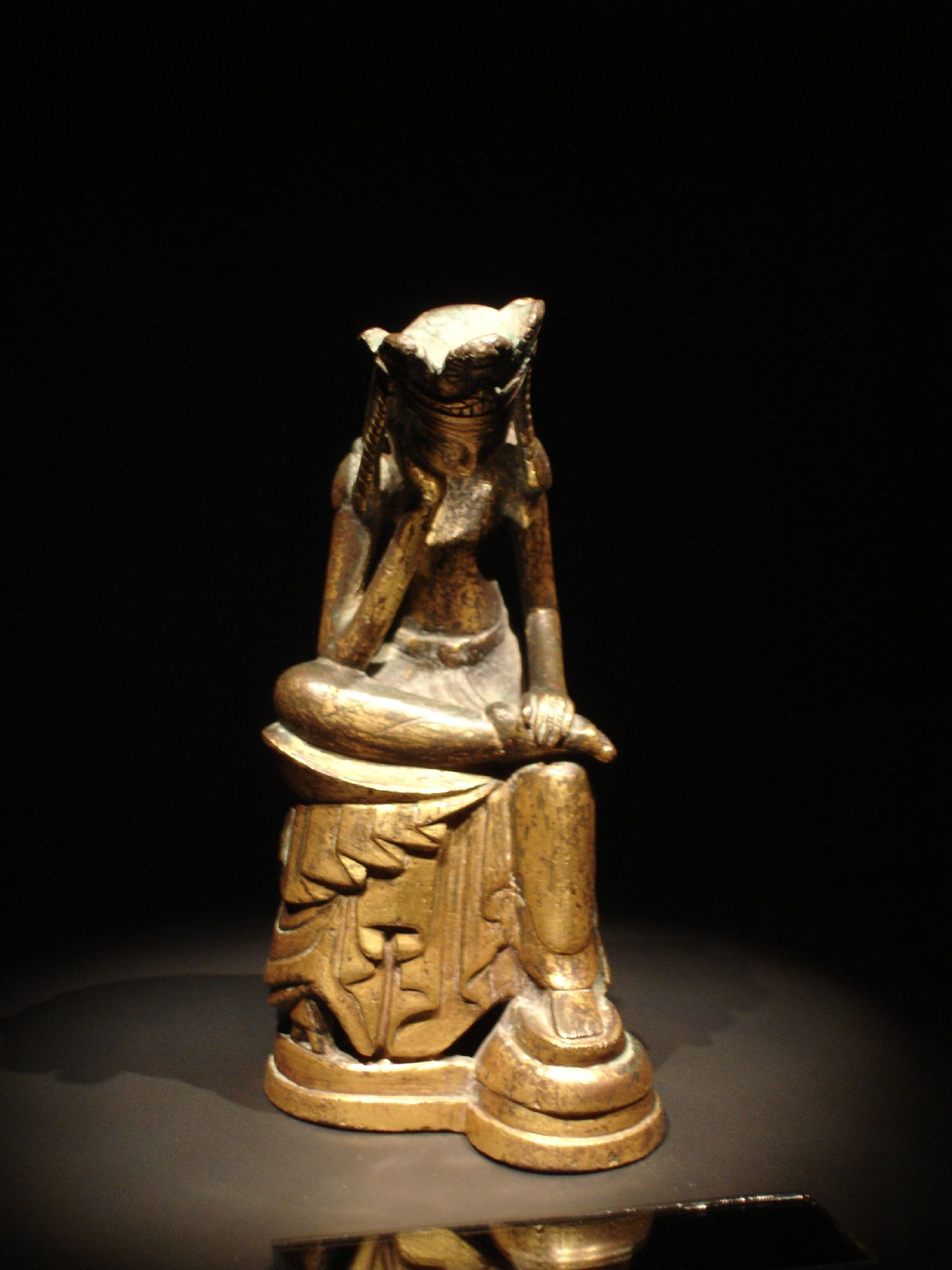
Semi-seated Bodhisattva Maitreya, Silla, early 7th century. Gilt bronze, h. 17.1 cm. National Museum of Korea.

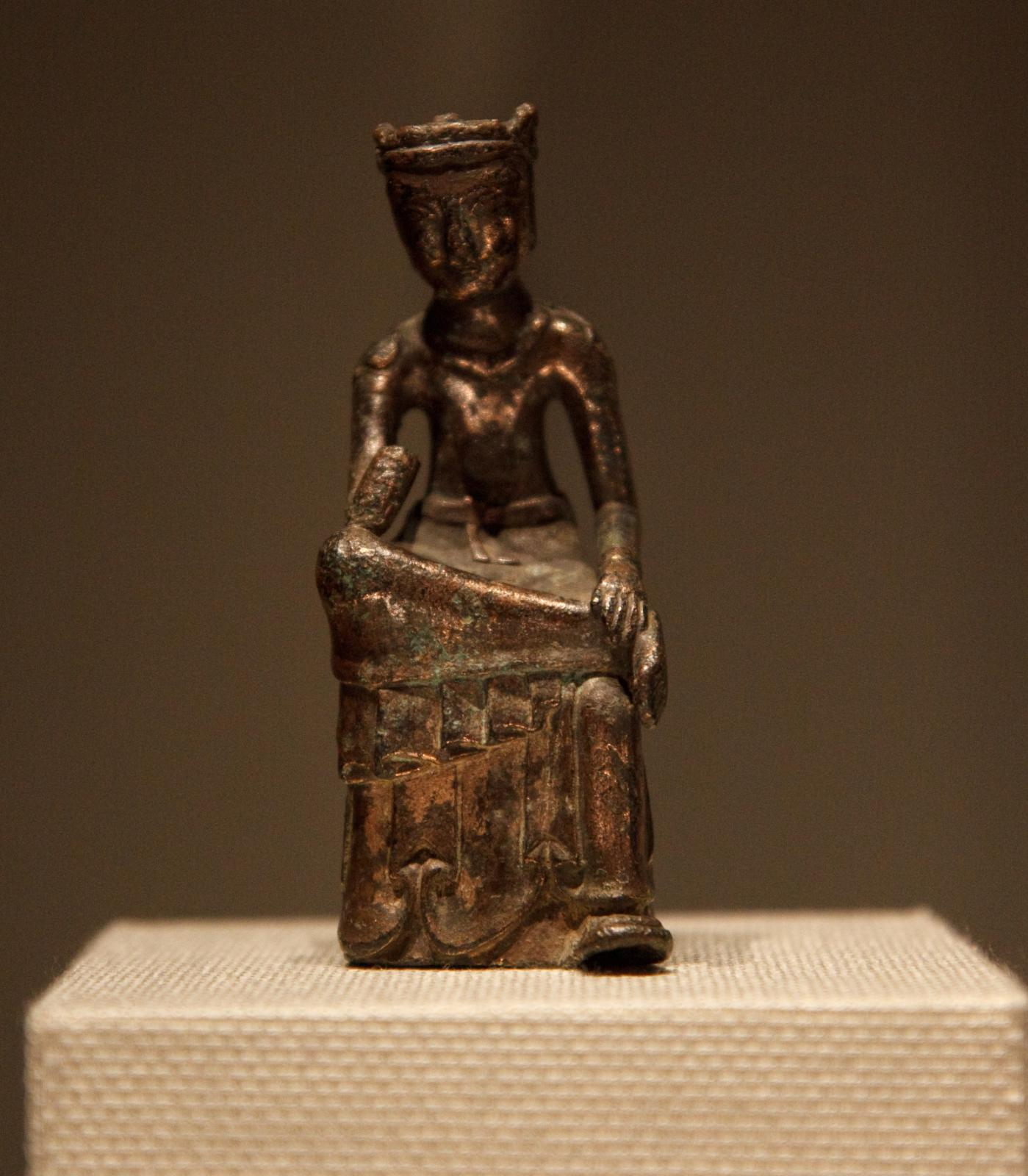

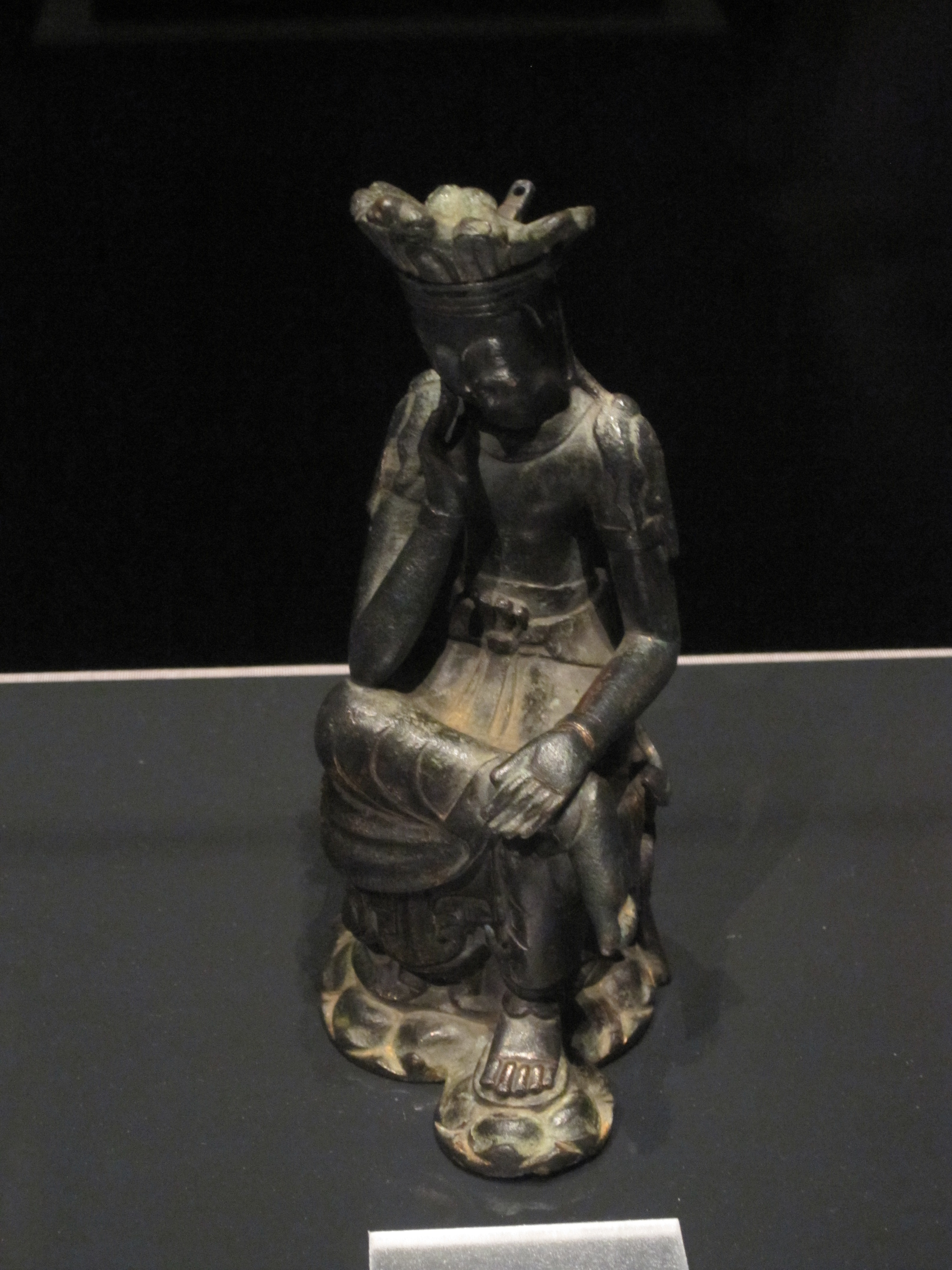
Pensive bodhisattva, Baekje, 7th century. Gilt bronze. Tokyo National Museum.

=== Korean images in Japan ===
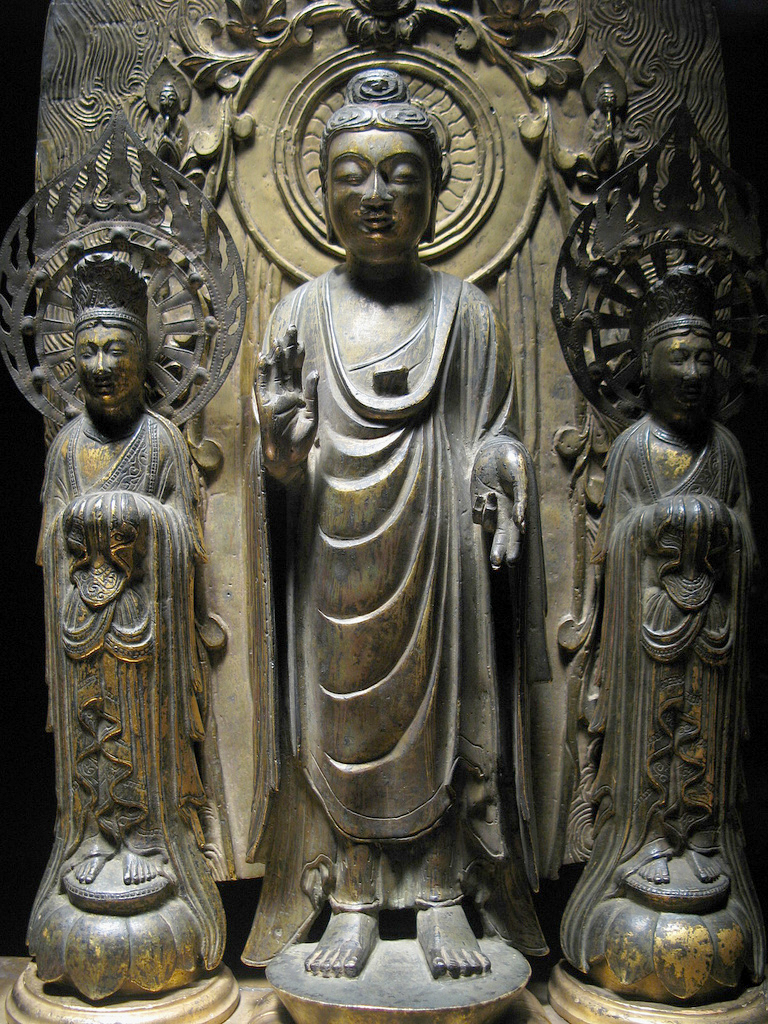
Standing Buddha and attendants, Baekje, 6th–7th century. Gilt bronze. Tokyo National Museum, Dedicated Horyu-ji Treasure no. 143.

Korean artists and style were still heavily influential to the nascent Buddhist movement in Japan in the 7th century. While the official introduction of Buddhism in Japan did occur in the 6th century, the religion faced a hostile aristocracy and it was not until the 7th century that Buddhism became an important part of Japanese culture. The Buddha at Asuka-dera, the earliest dated Japanese image, was cast in 606 by Tori Busshi an immigrant from Korea or China. The temple where the image is housed states that Tori Busshi was from Korea. The image has been repaired numerous times so it is difficult to see if any of its 7th century stylings are preserved. Another significant work by Tori Busshi is the Sakyamuni Triad housed at the Hōryū-ji which dates to 623. Both images bear some stylistic resemblances to images from the Northern Wei (image), popular approximately a hundred years before which suggests such Northern Wei styles were preserved in Korea for their reappearance in Japan. Although there are not many analogues to the so-called Tori style that survive in Korea a stone mandorla preserved in Iksan is one such example.

There are numerous other examples of Korean sculpture or images influenced by Korean style in Japan. The Kanshoin pensive bodhisattva (image) has three traits that suggest it was an import from Korea or made by a Korean immigrant in Japan. The strong constriction of the upper body, the incised line chiseled into the eyebrow, and tassel on the front of the crown. Scholars currently debate whether Hōryū-ji Dedicated treasure no. 156 (image) is Korean in origin or made in Japan, influenced by Korean styles. An inscription on its base can be plausibly attributed to either a 606 or 666 date. An early date would suggest a Korean origin because of the still developing nature of Japanese sculpture at the time. By 666, plenty of indigenous Japanese sculpture can be found. Some Korean traits include the emaciated body, three-tiered crown and head knot, and the extreme stylization of the drapery over the base. Either way, the image is an important example of Korean traits in early Japanese art. The inscription mentions Gaya, a group of statelets that were annexed by Paekche and Silla in the 6th century, which may suggest that the image preserves the style prevalent in the Nakdong River valley.

A single-mandorla triad, Hōryū-ji Dedicated Treasure no. 143 now in the possession of the Tokyo National Museum is a particularly fine example of Baekje sculpture in Japan from the 6th or 7th century. The Korean origins of the statue are based on the round and warm faces typical of Baekje style, the absence of an air of solemnity and austerity typical of the Tori style, the casting technique which used nails instead of spacers, and the intaglio effect on the bronze the artisan used to make the eyebrows, a typical Korean technique. The Dainichibo standing Buddha, Sekiyamajinja Bodhisattva, Hōryū-ji Treasure no. 165 may all be from Korea as well. Other possible examples of Baekje sculpture in Japan are the hidden image at Zenkoji (image), the Kudara Kannon (literally Baekje Avalokiteshvara) at Hōryū-ji, and the Yumedono Kannon.

Images made by Koreans or based on Korean styles

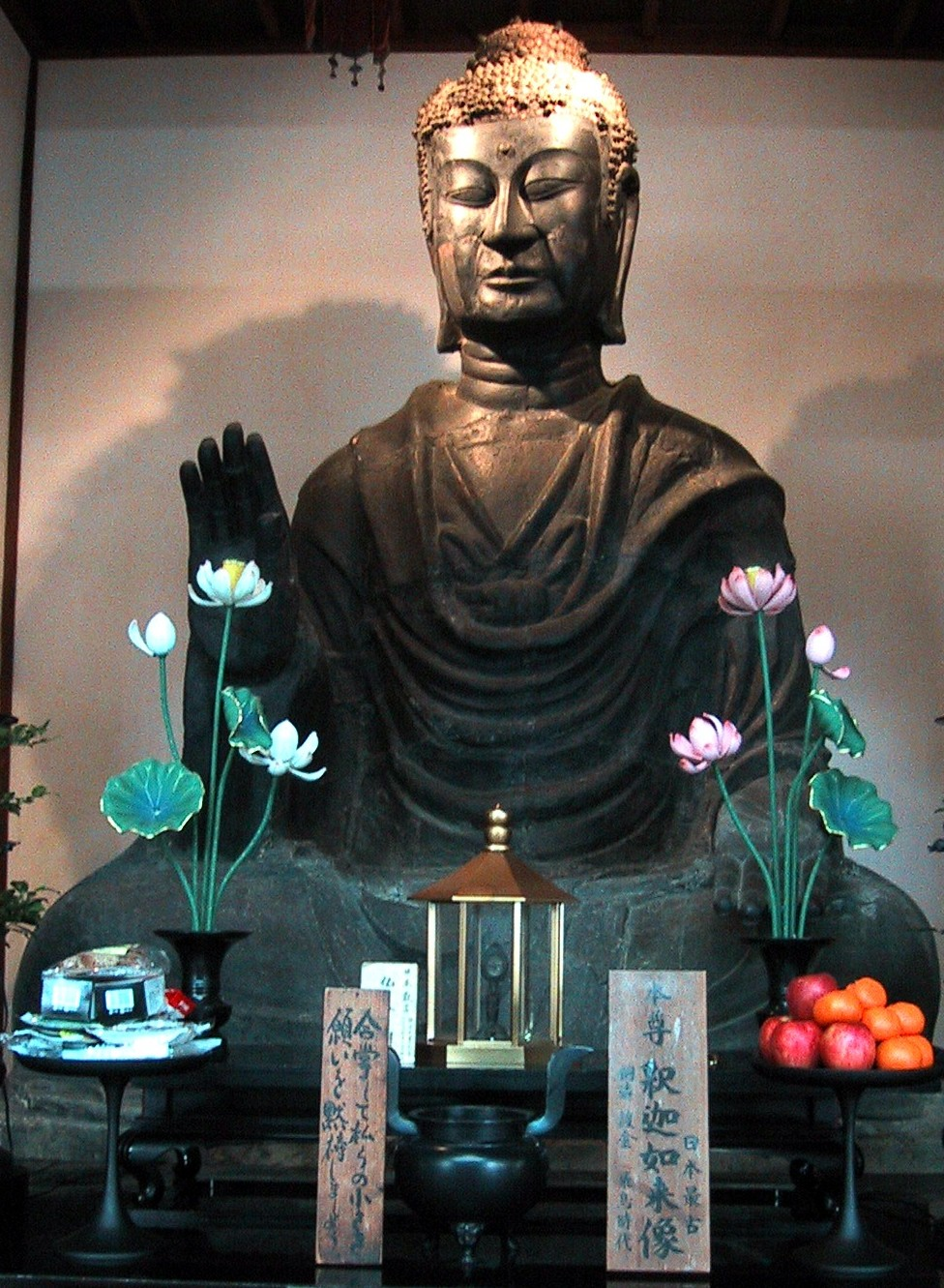
Asukadera Great Buddha.

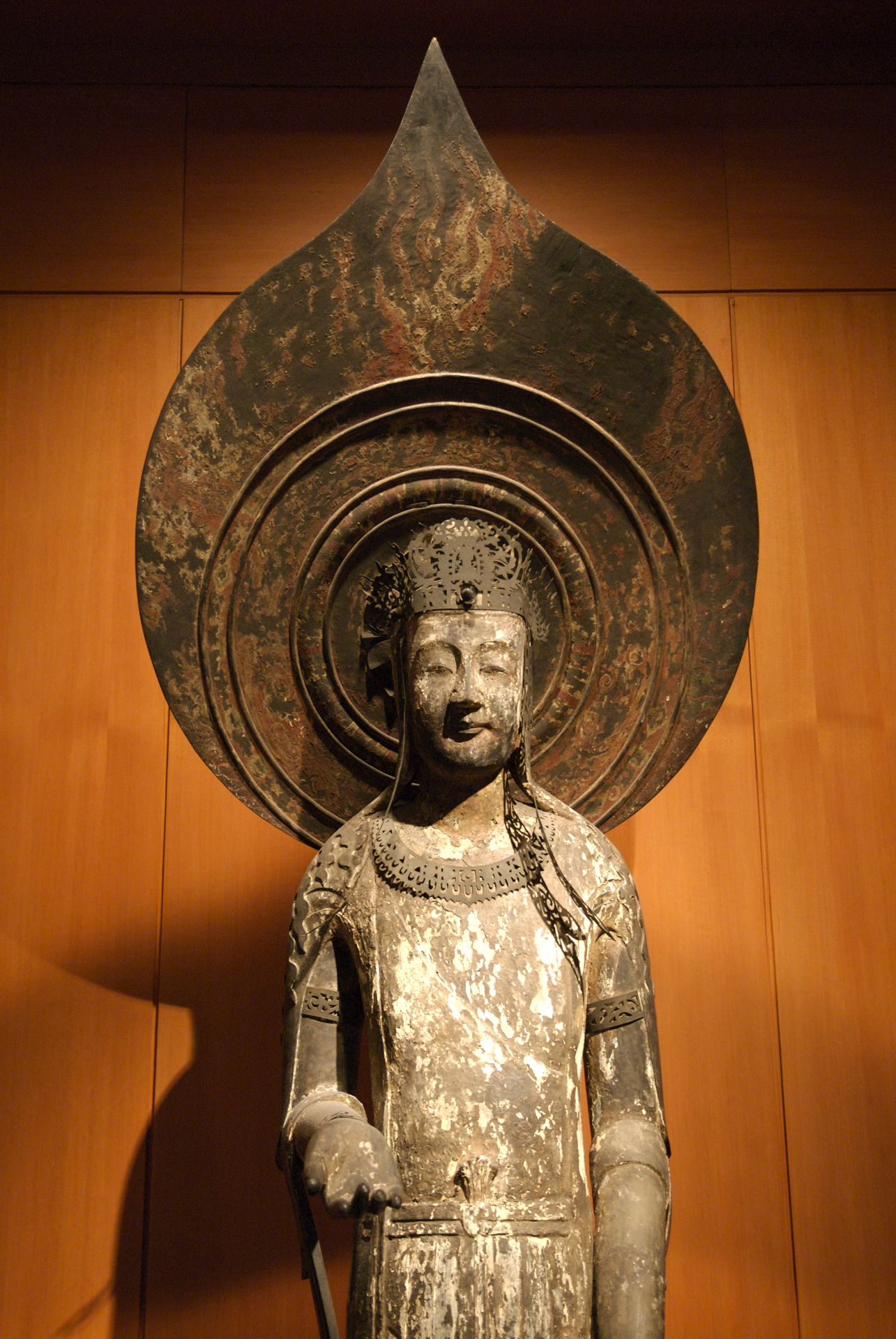
Kudara Kannon

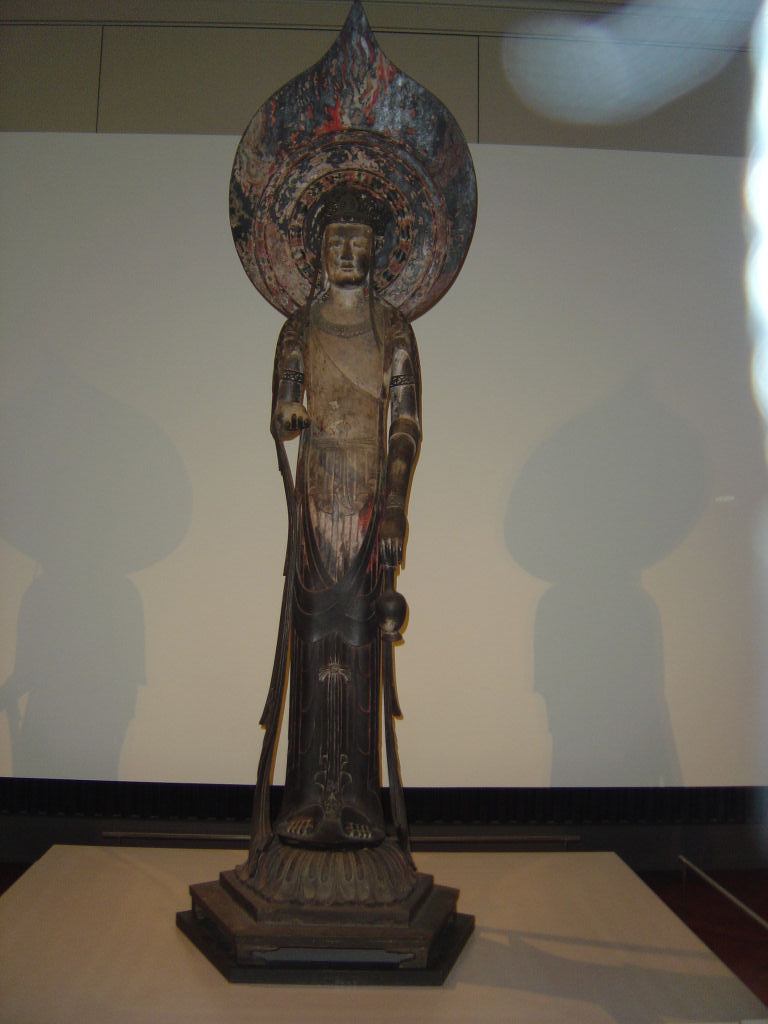
Kudara Kannon

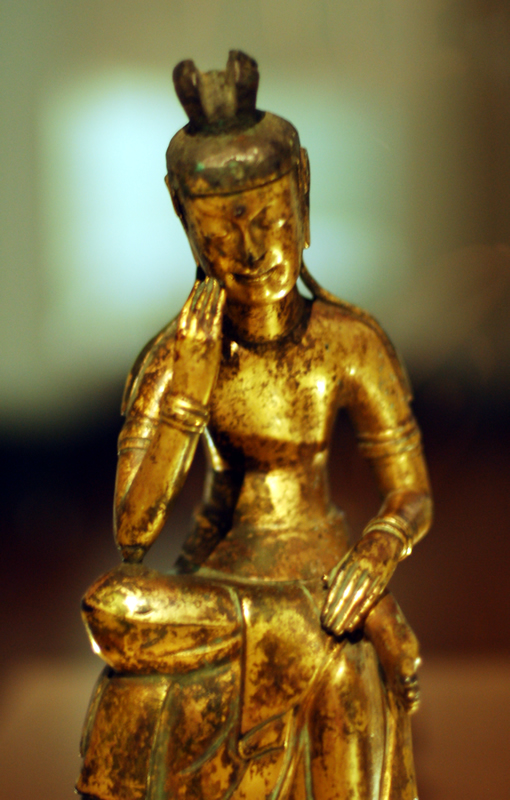
Pensive Bodhisattva Maitreya. Hakuho period or possibly Three Kingdoms of Korea period, 7th century. Gilt bronze, h. with pedestal 31 cm. Tokyo National Museum.

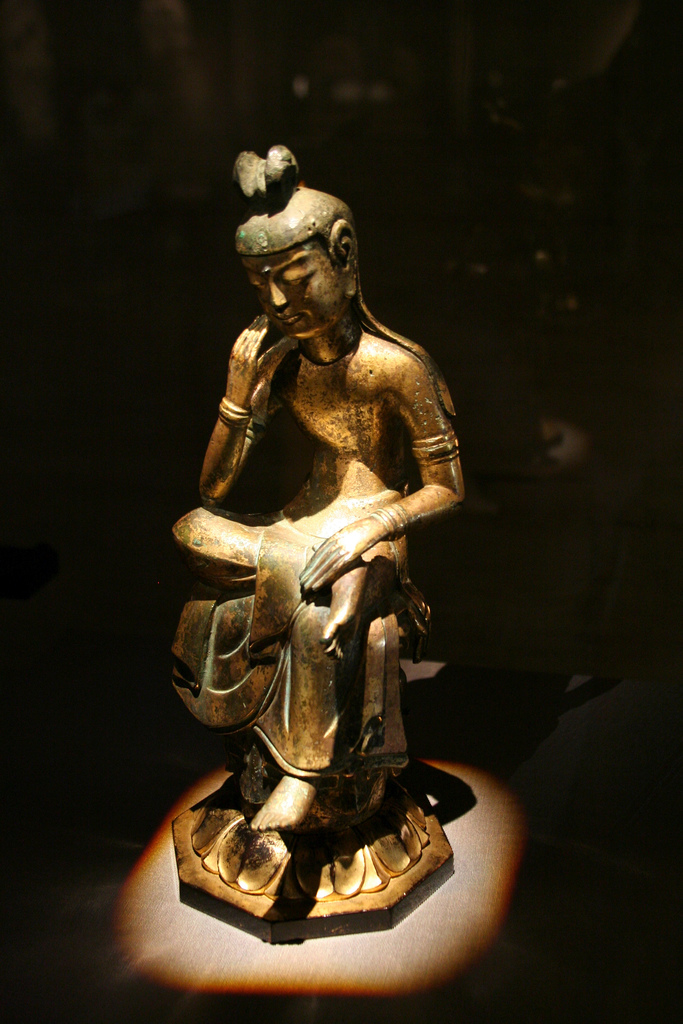

== Unified Silla (668–935) ==
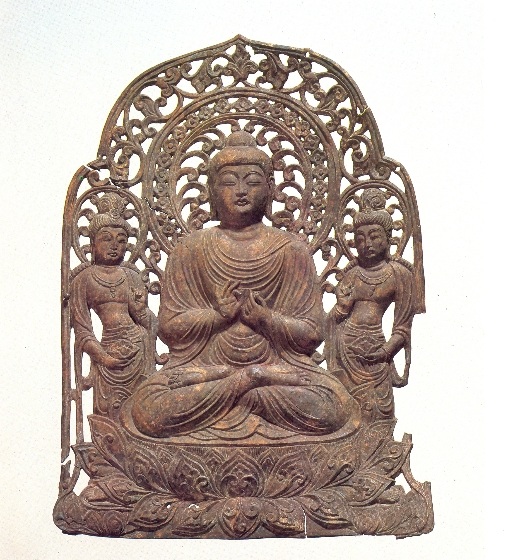
One of the group of gilt-bronze Buddhist plaques from Anapji, Treasure of South Korea No. 1475

After centuries of warfare, the Silla Kingdom, with their Tang allies, managed to unify much of what is now North and South Korea under the dominion of a single government in a period historians usually refer to as Unified Silla. While Silla's Tang allies were useful in helping the Silla rulers destroy their rivals, the kingdoms of Baekje and Goguryeo, after their mutual enemies were defeated the allies found themselves at cross purposes. The Tang emperor, following the ambitions of his predecessors, wanted to incorporate Korea into his empire while the Silla rulers vowed to maintain an independent realm. By 676, people from all the Three Kingdoms had expelled the Chinese from Korea and the Unified Silla state enjoyed a period of great prosperity and relative peace that would last several centuries. Some of the greatest Buddhist statues in Korean art history were made during this time.

=== Statues by date ===
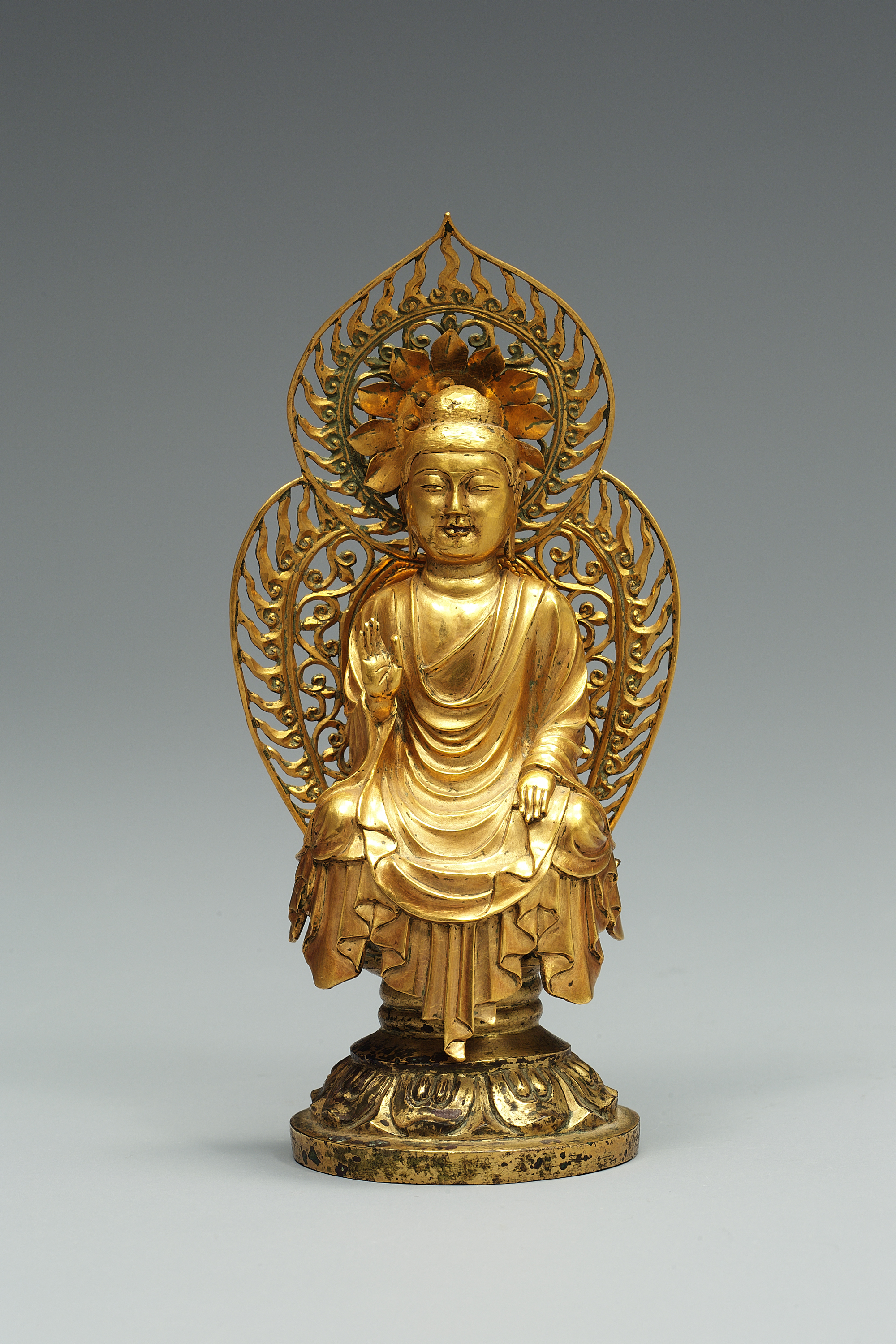
Seated Buddha, 706. Gold, h. 12 cm. National Museum of Korea, National Treasure no. 79.

Images dated to the Unified Silla period are relatively more plentiful than their counterparts from the Three Kingdoms period. There are several dated images which serve as important markers that show the evolution of Korean sculpture during this era. The first set of important dated images are a group of Buddhist stele excavated from former Baekje territory with dated inscriptions. One of the most important examples, shown below, is a stele dated to 673, thirteen years after the defeat of the Baekje Kingdom. This image has an important inscription which states that the statue was carved by artisans from the former Baekje Kingdom and funded by former Baekje aristocrats. This image, and the others from group, suggest that Baekje nobility were incorporated into the Silla political system so that they could help their new overlords govern subjugated territory. The stele, reminiscent of a single mandorla triad, has a close analogue to the famous Sakyamuni Triad in the Horyu-ji cast by a Korean sculptor in 623. Not only does the stele provide a clue that suggests that the Sakyamuni Triad may have been based on styles from Baekje specifically, this suggests also that Silla art incorporated the styles and practices of their conquered subjects in subsequent art.

The next two examples, both Korean national treasures and both made of almost pure gold, were probably royal commissions. The two were excavated from a stone pagoda and an accompanying relic contains dates describing the dates of interment for both statues. The first image, a standing Buddha which could have been made as late as 692, the date of its purported interment, shows that the style of the preceding Three Kingdoms period, especially in the modeling of the robe, persisted several decades after unification. The second image, dated to 706 is an exquisite and rare example of a seated Buddha from Korea during this time period and the contrast in style with its counterpart is quite striking. The seated Buddha incorporates the latest styles from Tang China and is a beautiful example of the so-called International Style practiced throughout East Asia. Some small discrepancies between the height described by inscription and the actual height of the seated Buddha, along with the rough nature of the standing Buddha may suggest the attributed dates are not entirely accurate.

Two granite images from the early 8th century, almost entirely intact, depict Amitabha and Maitreya. Valuable inscriptions are carved on the backs of the mandorla.

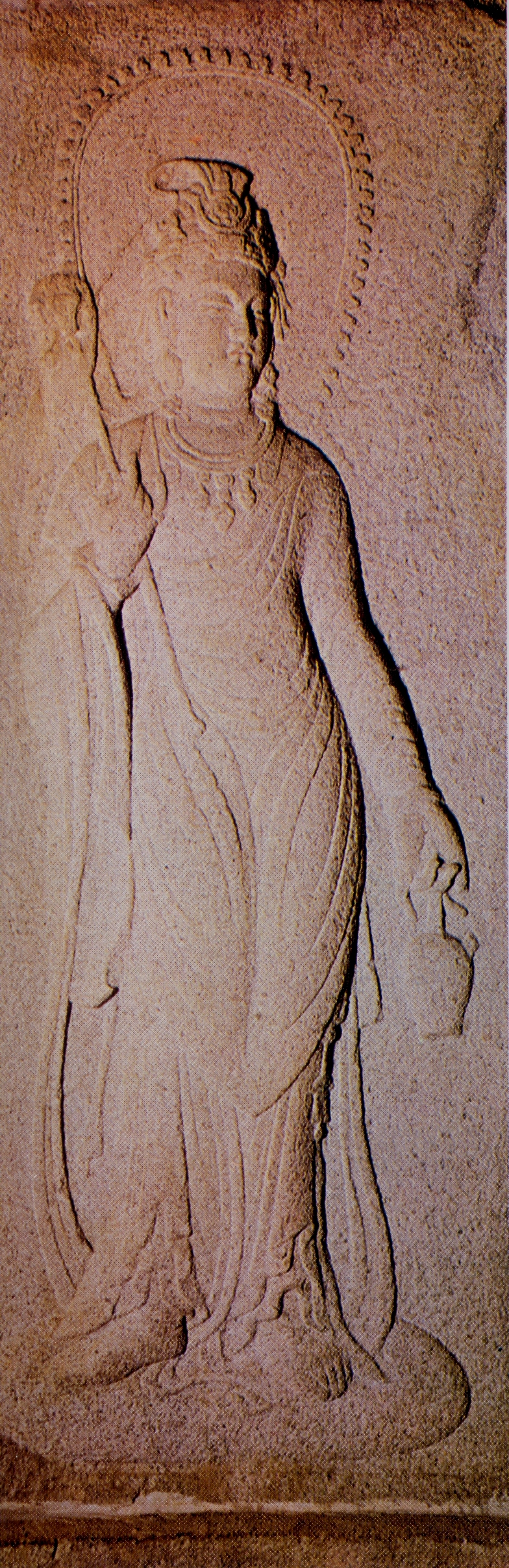
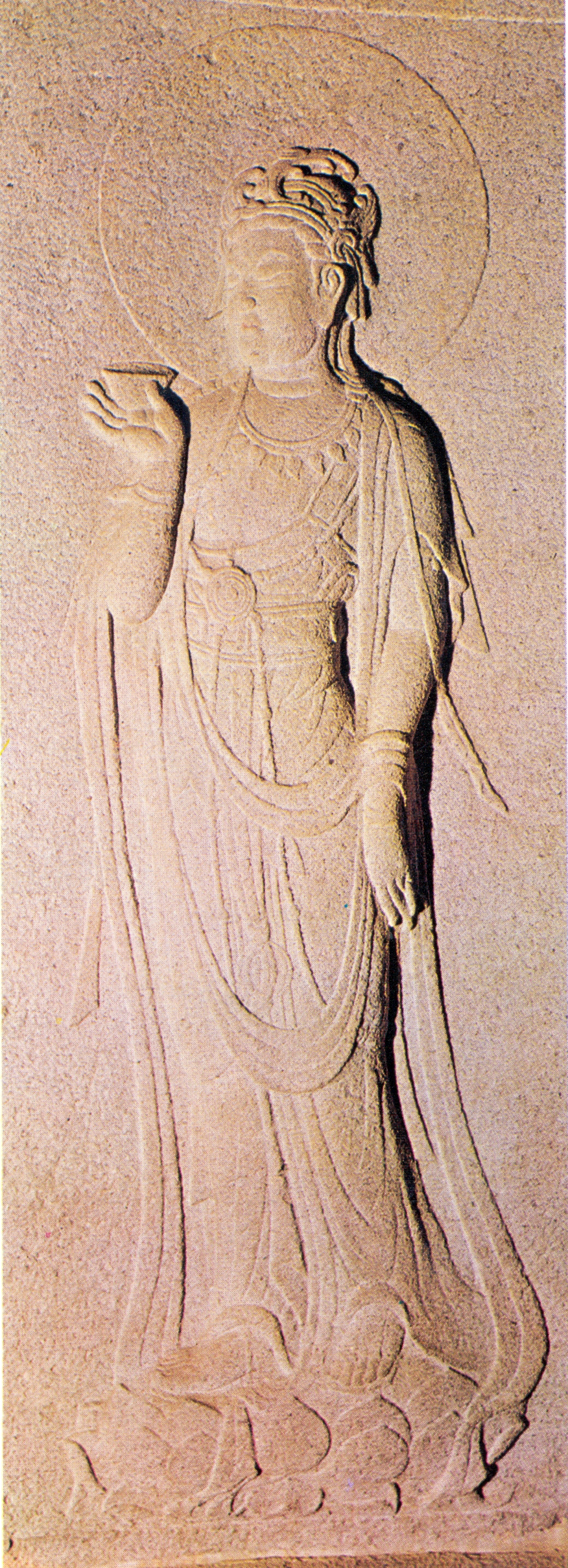
The indra on the left and the Samantabhadra on the right. Silla, 8th century. Along the lower part of the circular wall under the dome of the Seokguram are reliefs of three bodhisattvas, ten disciples and two Hindu devas.

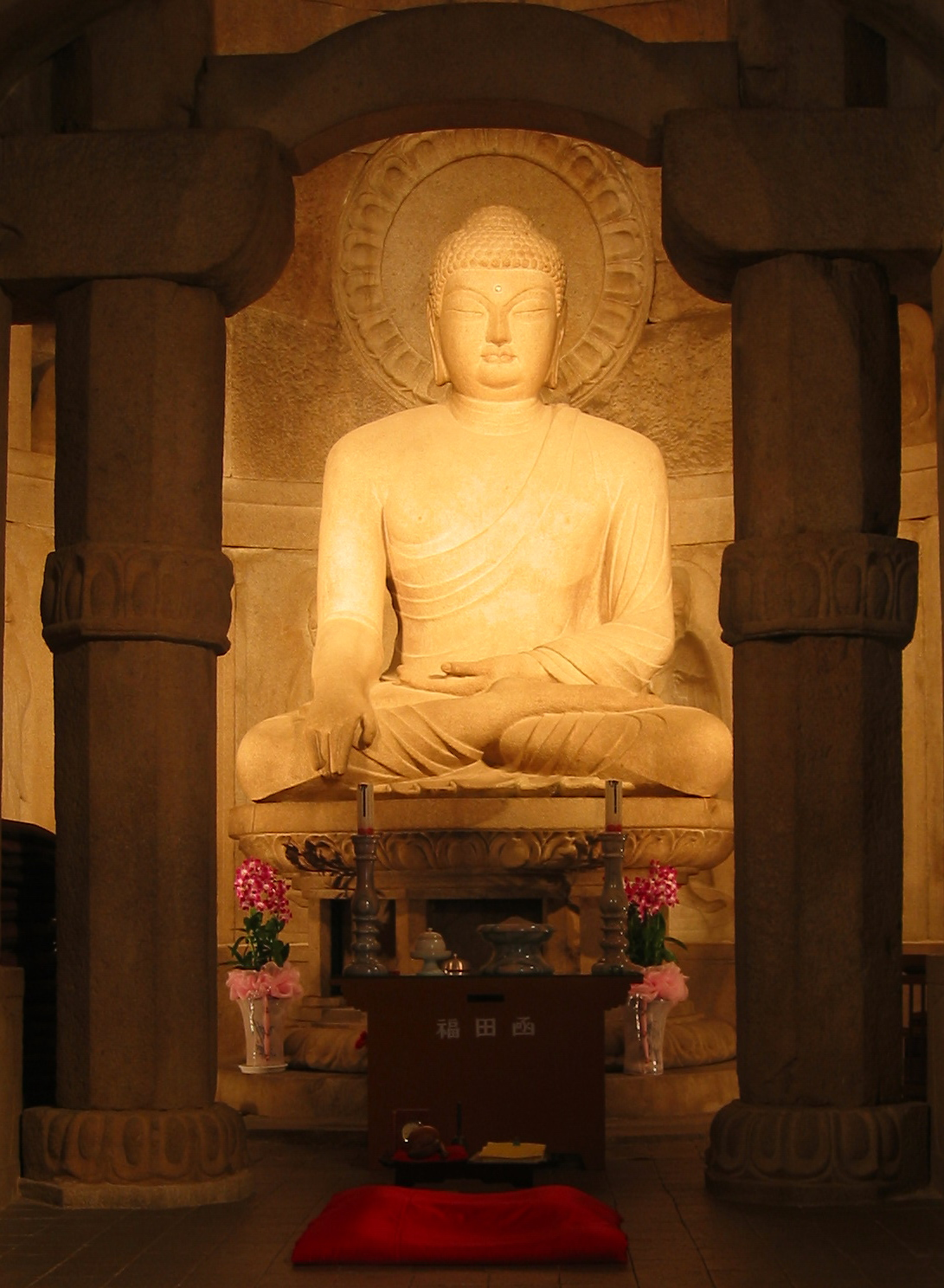
Seated main Buddha, in the middle of the 8th century. Granite, h. 3.26 m. Seokguram, National Treasure no. 24.

Granite, a common medium in the repertoire of Sillan sculptors are seen throughout the Unified Silla period. At least one attempt at the kind of grotto art popular in India and China can be found in Gunwi that precedes the Seokguram Grotto. However, it is the central Buddha of the Seokguram Grotto that is considered by some scholars to be the epitome of Korean sculpture. Situated in the center of a complex, artificial cave, the Buddha is surrounded by artful depictions of the Buddhist pantheon. According to the Samguk yusa construction began in the middle of the 8th century and the sculpture of the grotto, based on this source, can be tentatively dated to that time. The style of central Buddha, including the covering of one shoulder and the fan of folds between the two crossed legs, would be followed by sculptors for the rest of the Unified Silla period and even by artisans of the early Koryo dynasty.

The final dated example is a seated Vairocana Buddha dated by inscription to 858. This Buddha is representative of the images of the 9th century, a time of political turbulence and the weakened power of the Silla rulers in the capital. During this time powerful land owners far away from the central government began to commission their own Buddhist images, as the inscription on the Borimsa (McR. Porimsa) Buddha states. These regional images began to reflect individual styles that differ starkly from the Kumseong tradition in the capital. The Borimsa image, for example, has a thick nose ridge, brow, and robes that differ from the Seokguram prototype. Additionally, while images in the capital were still produced in prestigious bronze, regional Buddhas begin to be made with iron, a material that was considerably cheaper. The production of iron images differ greatly from their bronze counterparts because iron images were cast piece by piece and assembled into a single image. This technique results in visible joints were plates were connected together and then probably hidden with thick layers of lacquer and gilding.

Statues by date

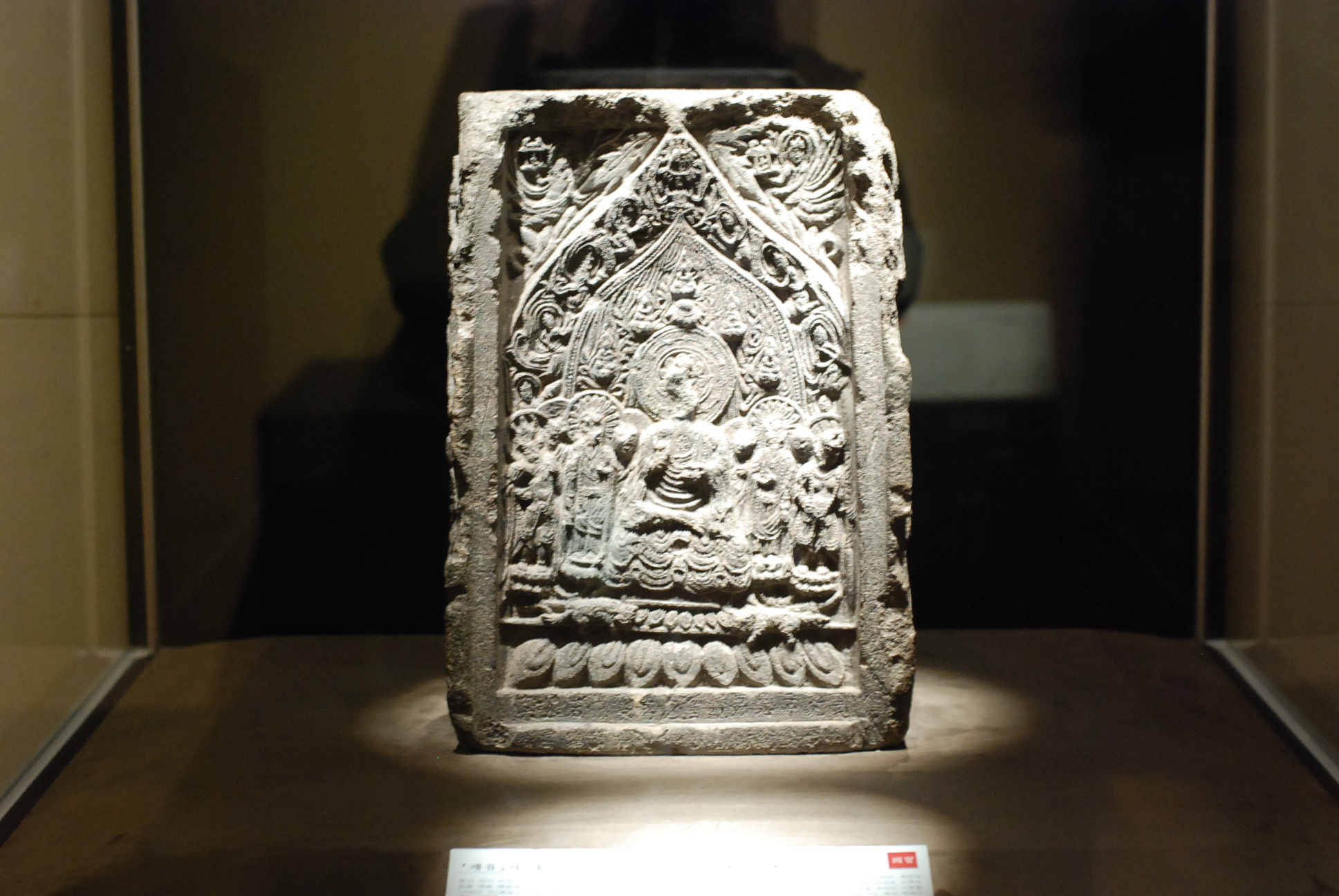
Dated 673 by inscription.

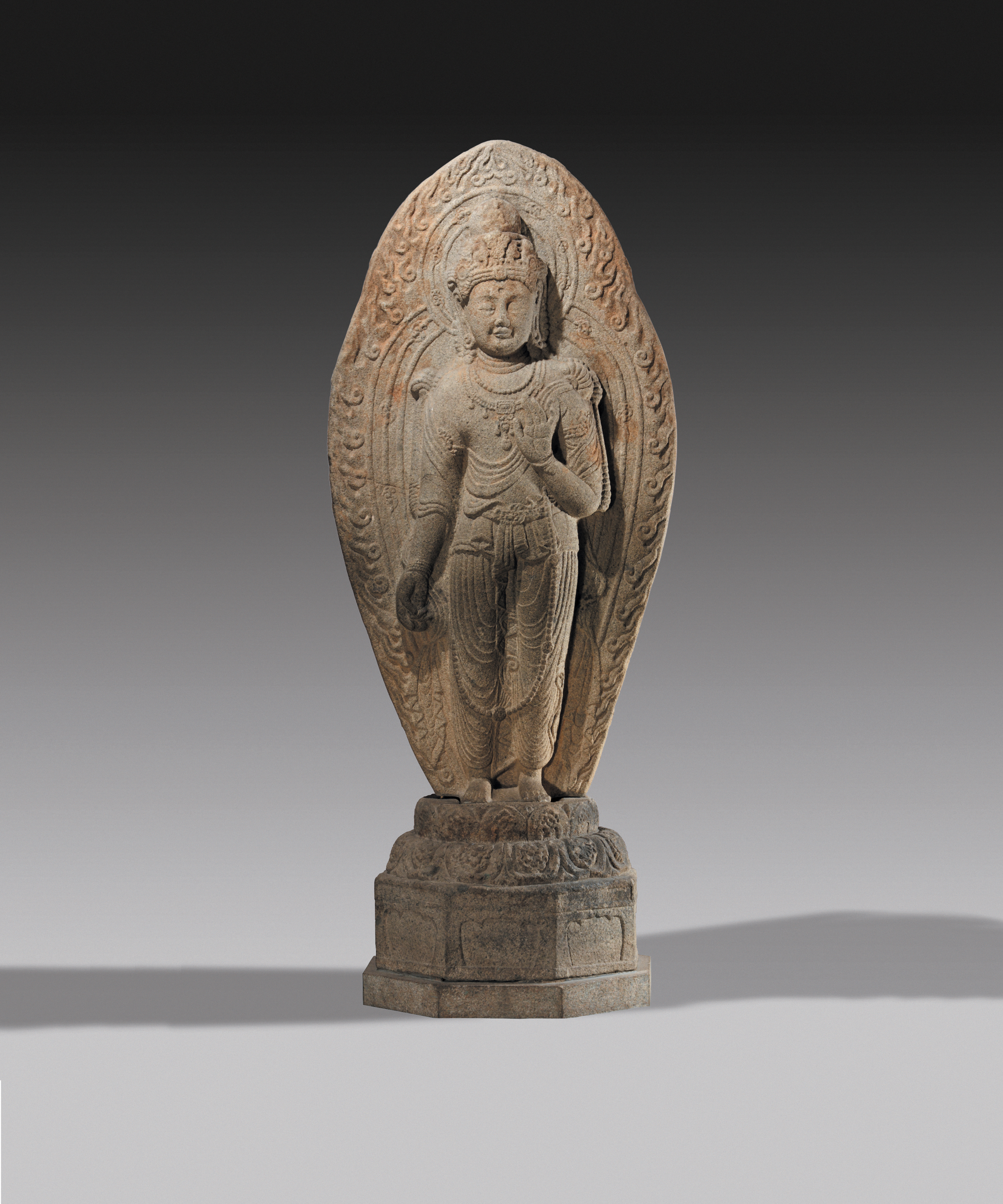
Dated 719 by inscription.

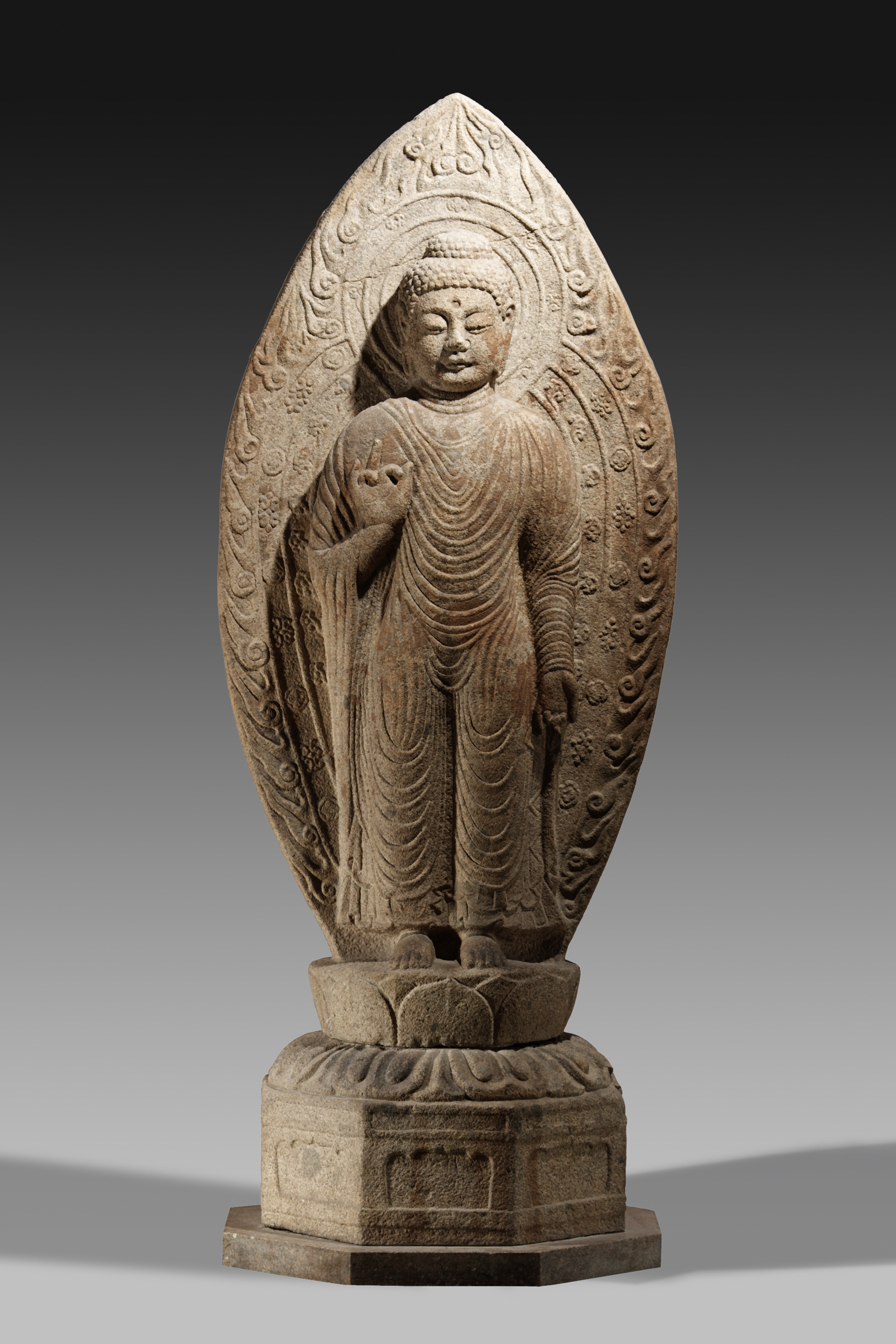
Dated 719 by inscription.

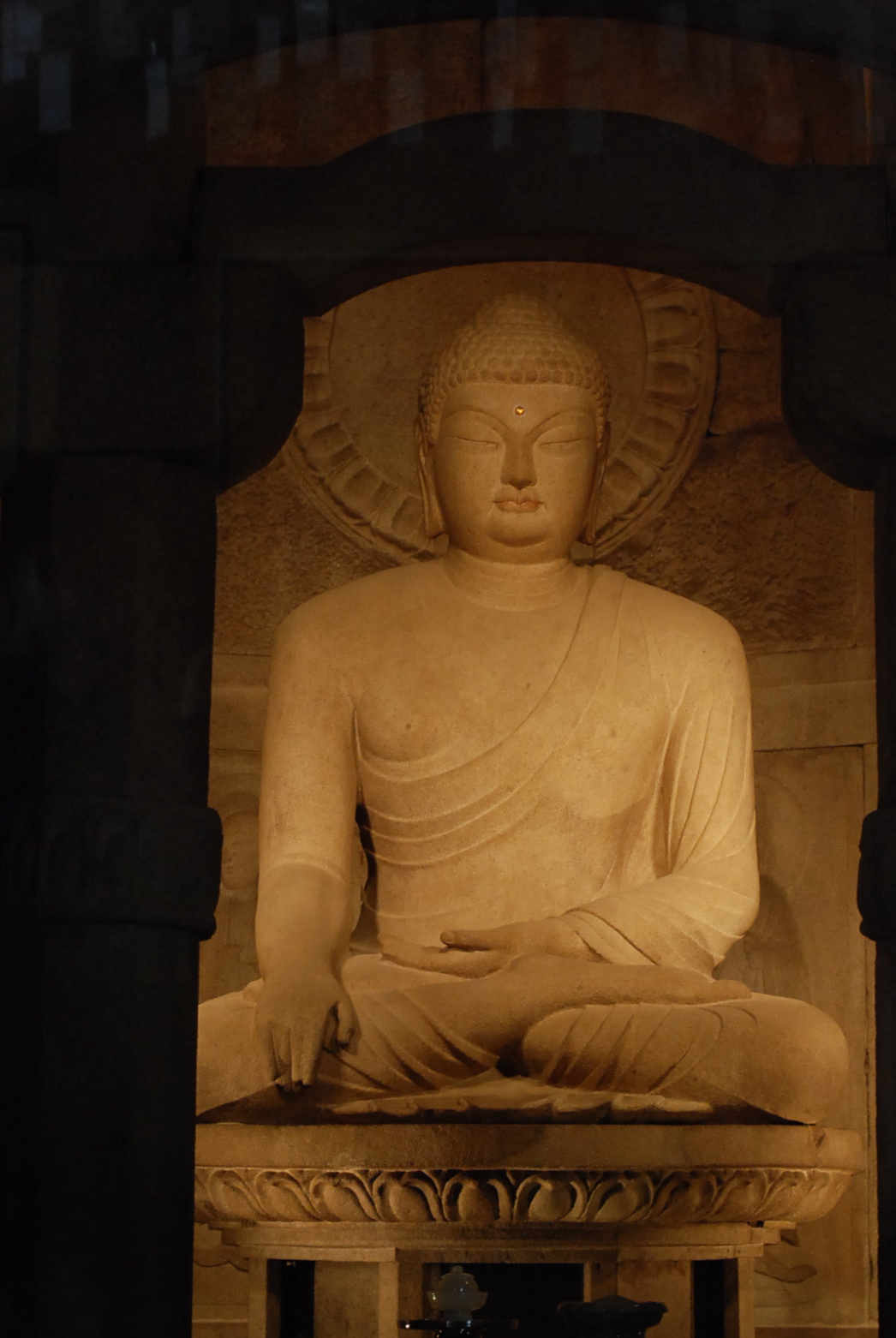
C. mid-8th century by historical record.

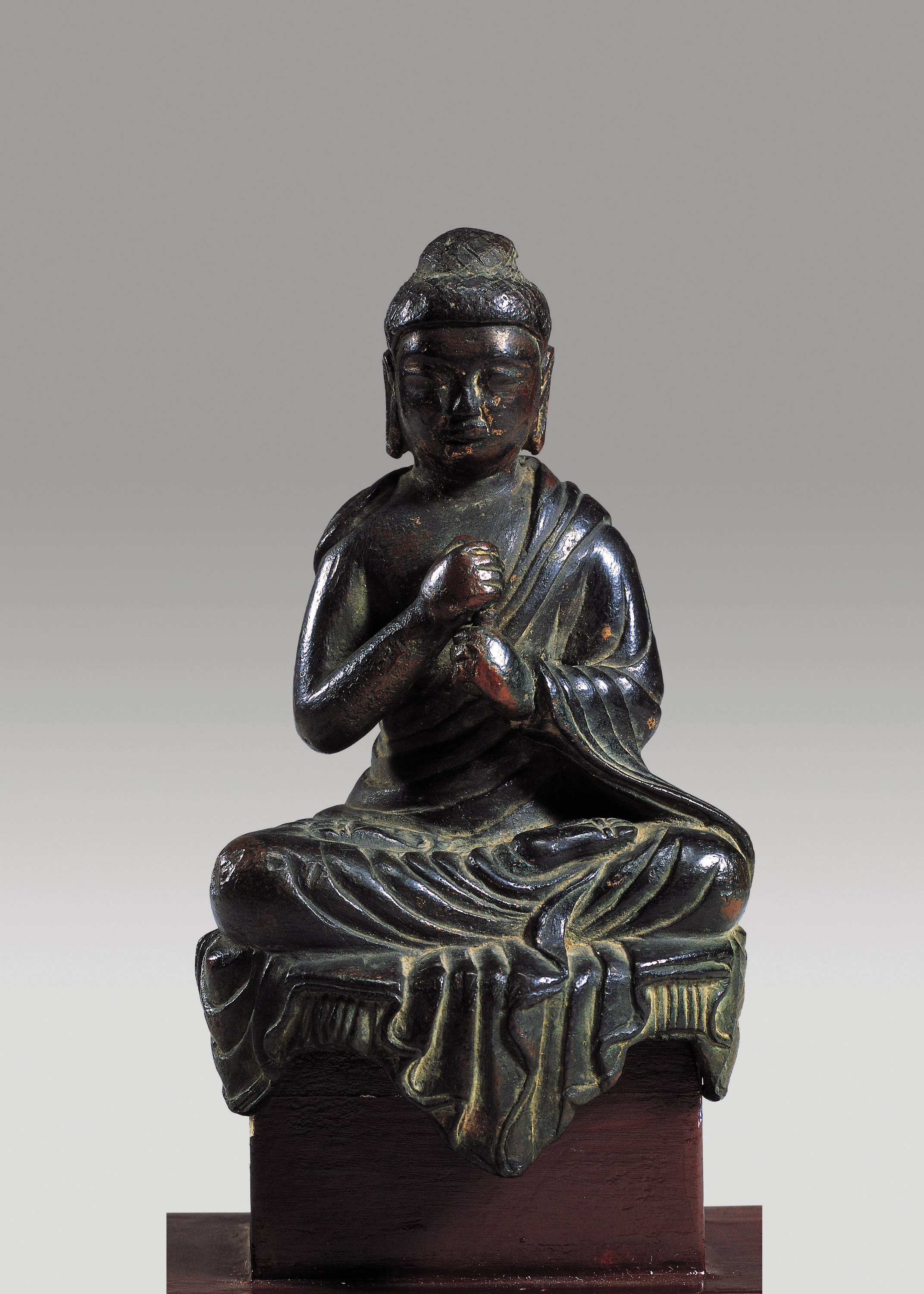
Dated 766, Unified Silla dynasty

=== Statues by iconography ===
Buddha

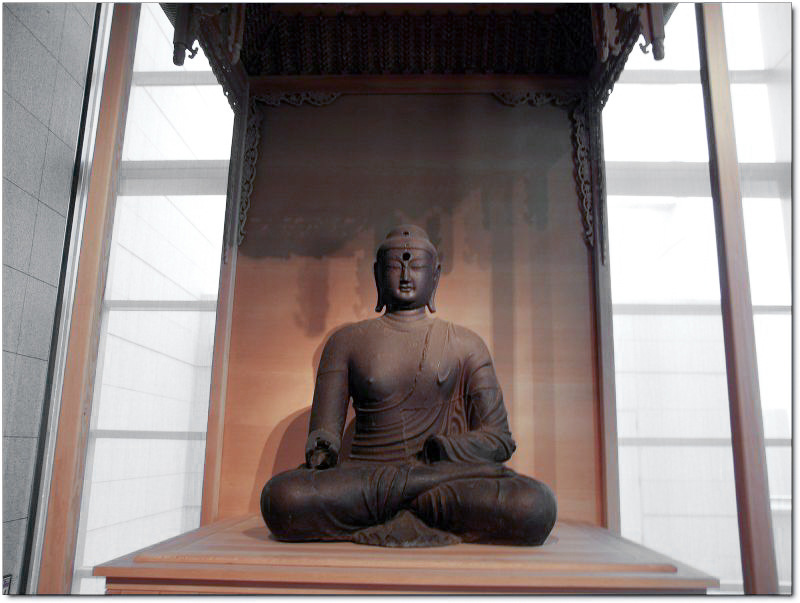
Seated Buddha, early 10th century. Cast iron, h. 150 cm. National Museum of Korea.

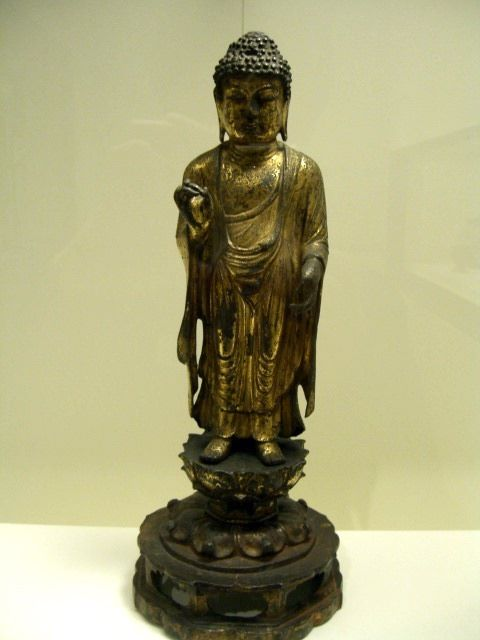
Standing Buddha. Unified Silla period, 7th century., c. 700. Gilt bronze, h. 47.3 cm. Asian Art Museum of San Francisco, Avery Brundage Collection.

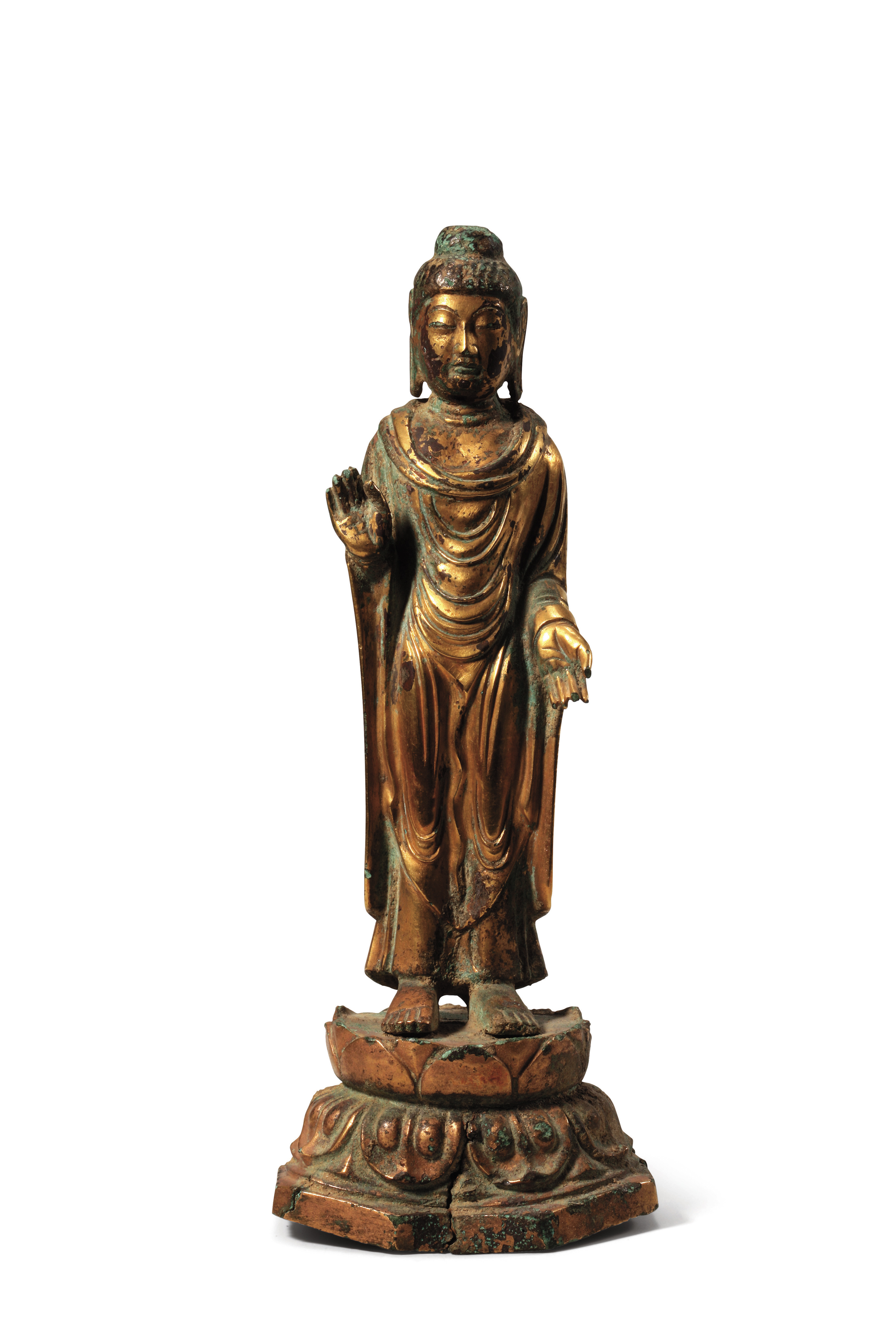
Standing Buddha. Unified Silla period. Gilt bronze, h. 23.9 cm. National Museum of Korea.

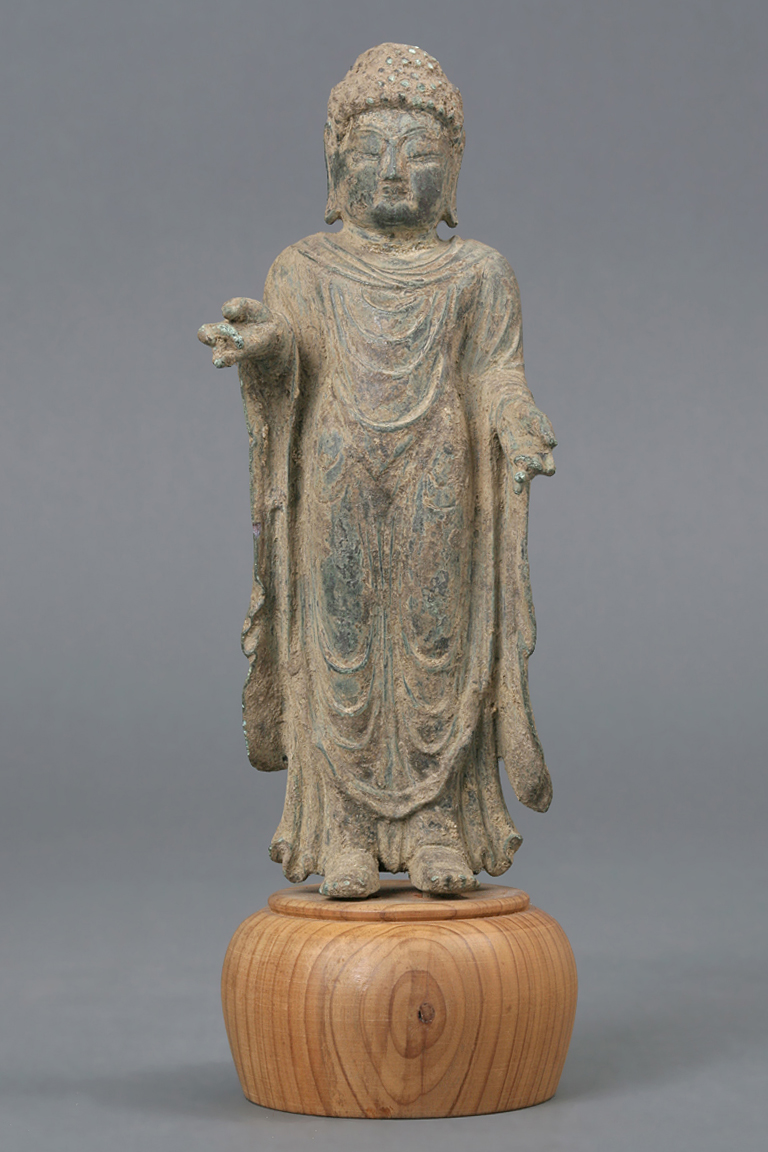
Standing Buddha, gilt-bronze, Unified Silla. Dongguk University Museum, Seoul, South Korea.

Vairocana

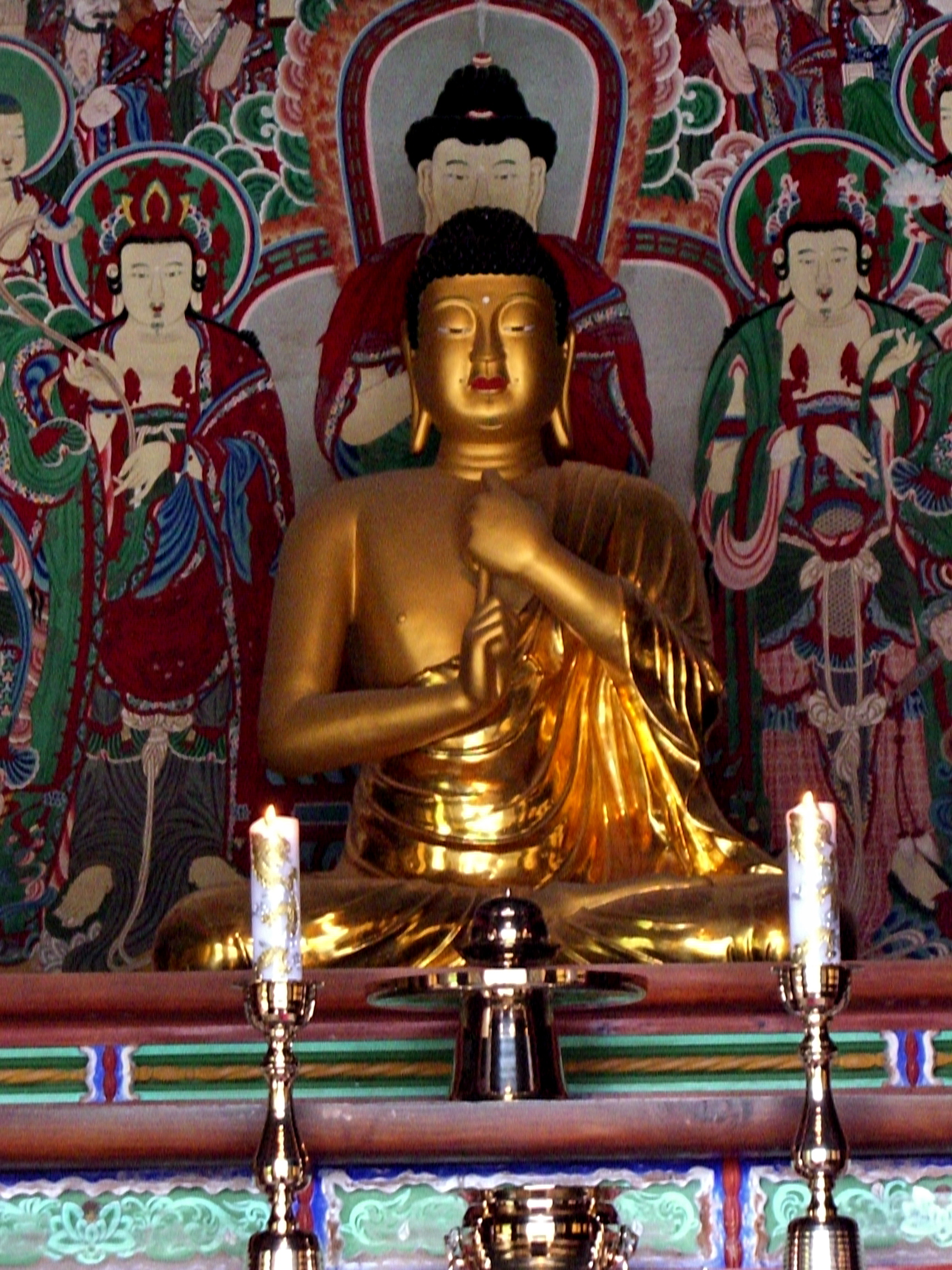
Seated Vairocana, early 9th century. Gilt bronze, h. 1.77 m. Bulguksa, National Treasure no. 26

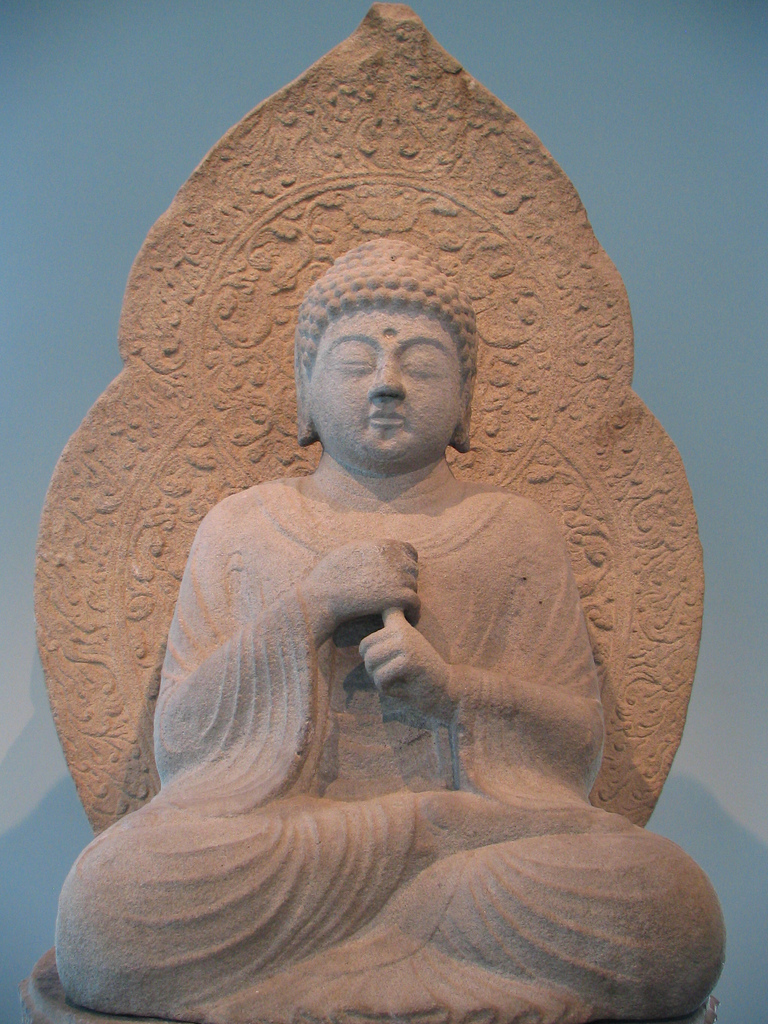
Seated Vairocana, 9th century. Stone. National Museum of Korea.

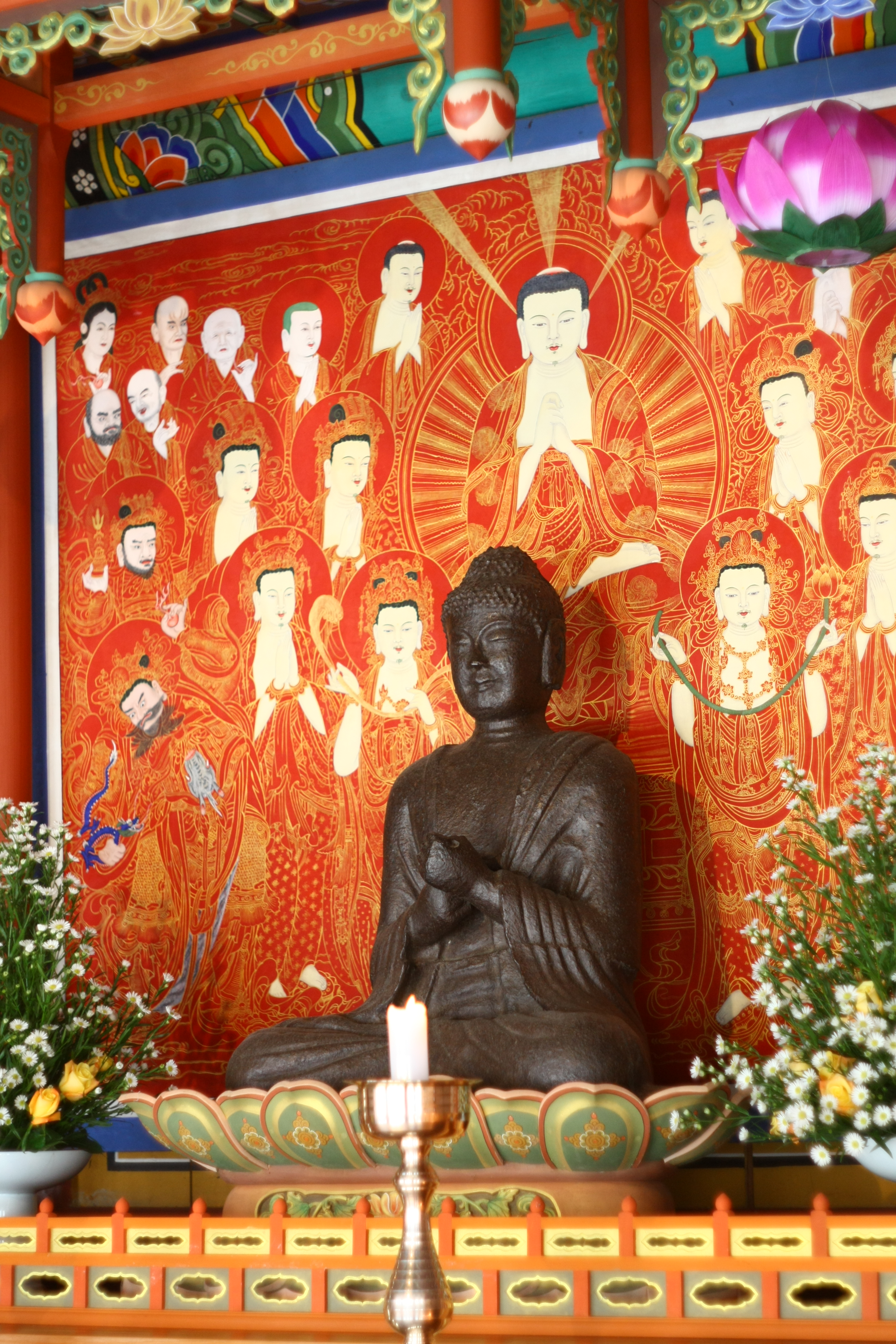
Seated Vairocana, 9th century. Iron, Jeungsimsa. Gwangju, South Korea

Bhaisajyaguru

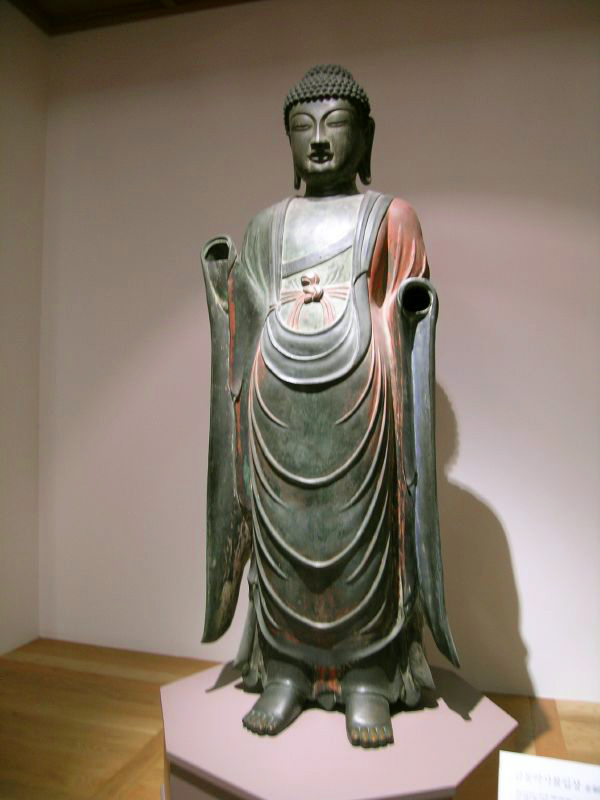
Standing Bhaisajyaguru, middle 8th century. 1.77 m. Gyeongju National Museum, National Treasure no. 28.

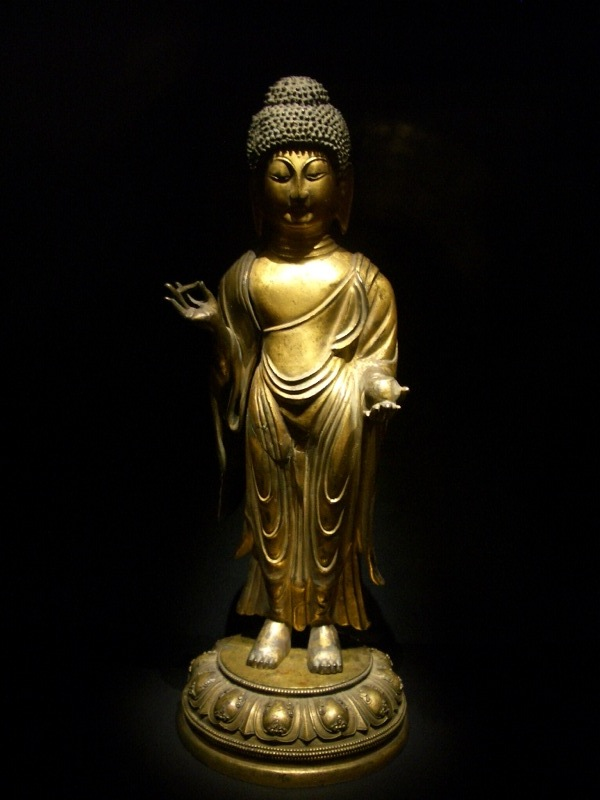
Standing Bhaisajyaguru, 9th century. Gilt bronze, h. 29.2 cm. National Museum of Korea.

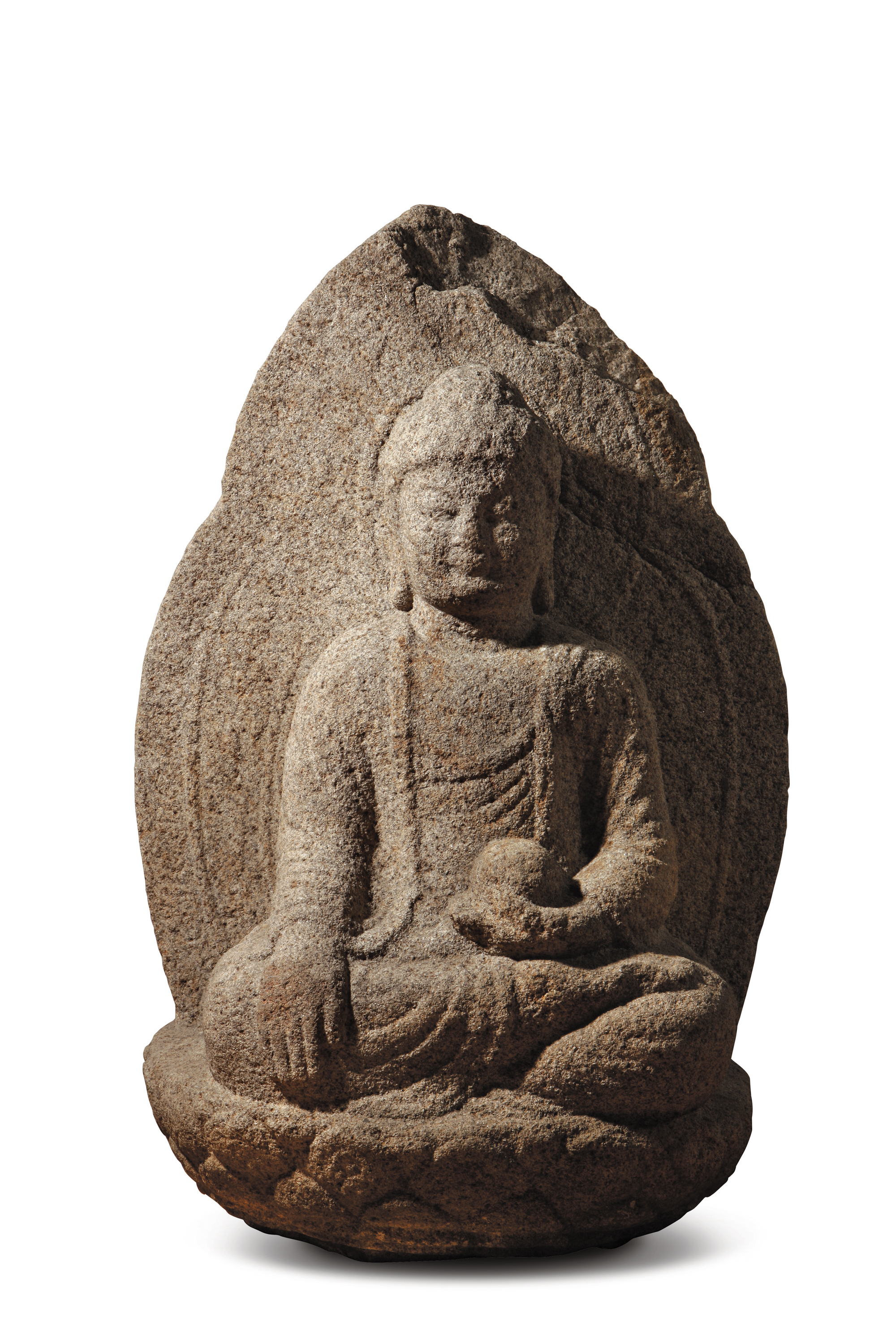
Stone Seated Bhaisajyaguru Buddha. late 8th century, Silla. National Museum of Korea.

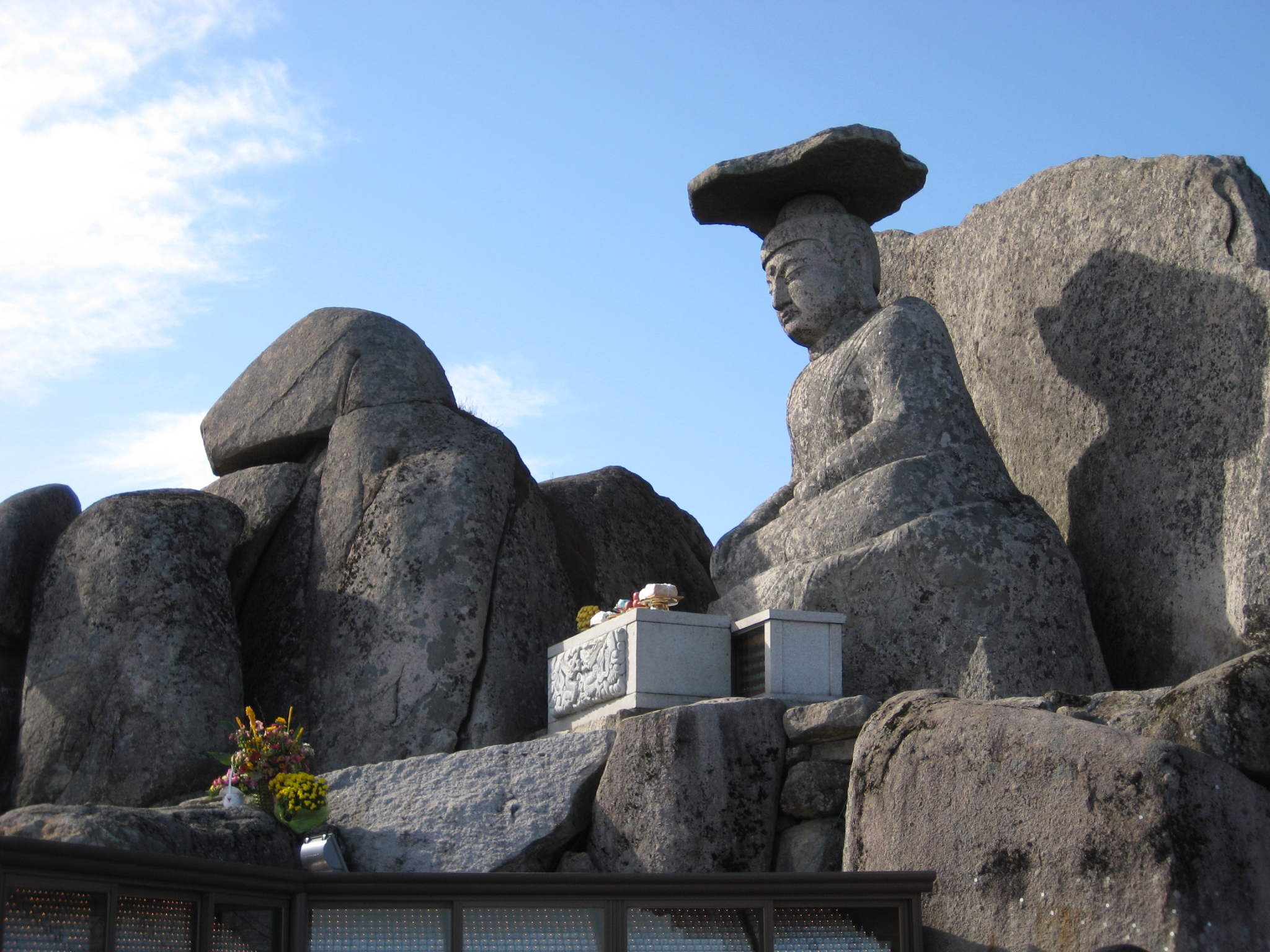
Gatbawi Buddha, in situ Daegu, South Korea

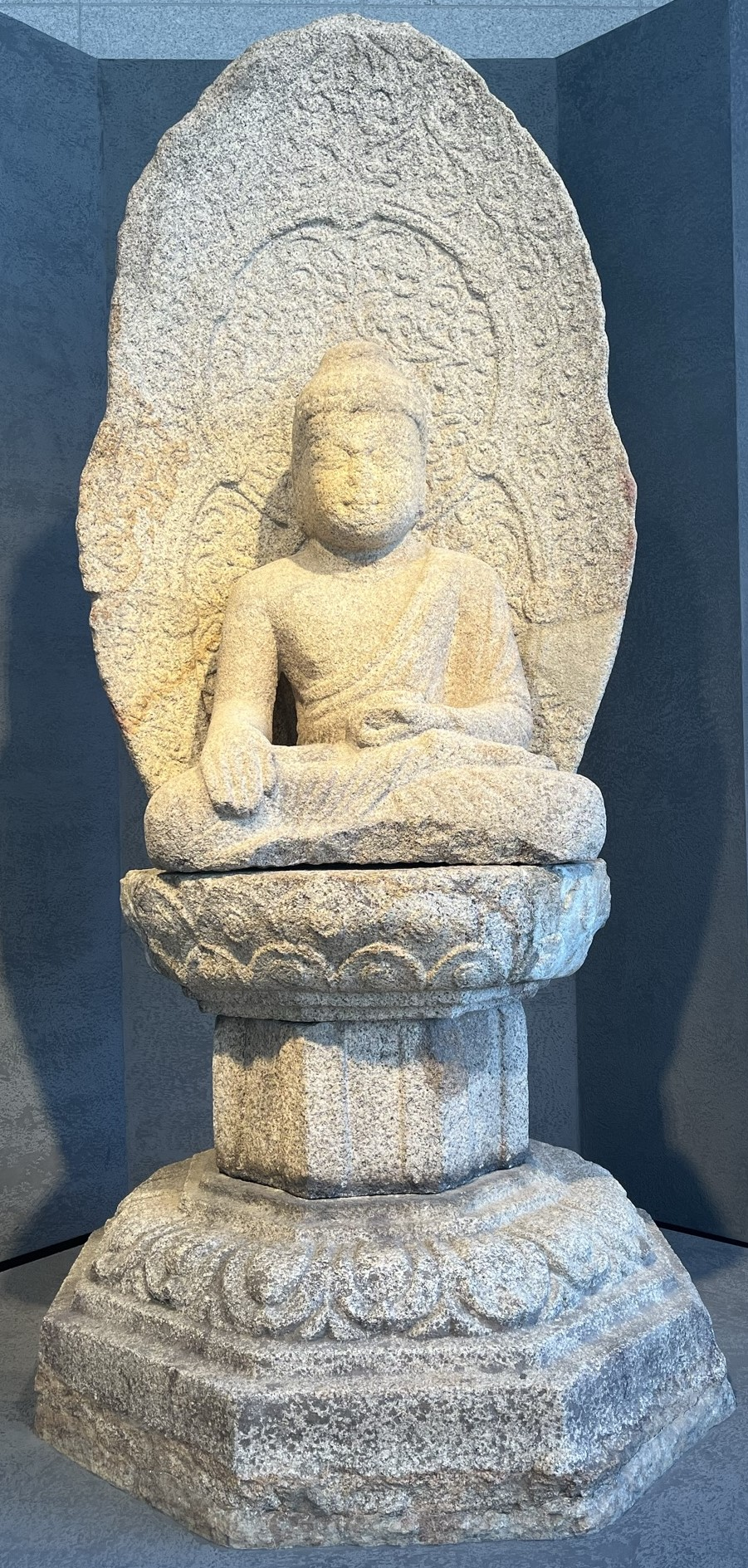
Stone seated Bhaisajyaguru, presumed to have been made between the late 8th and early 9th centuries. 109 cm, Gyeongju National Museum, Bongwan 1957

Bodhisattva

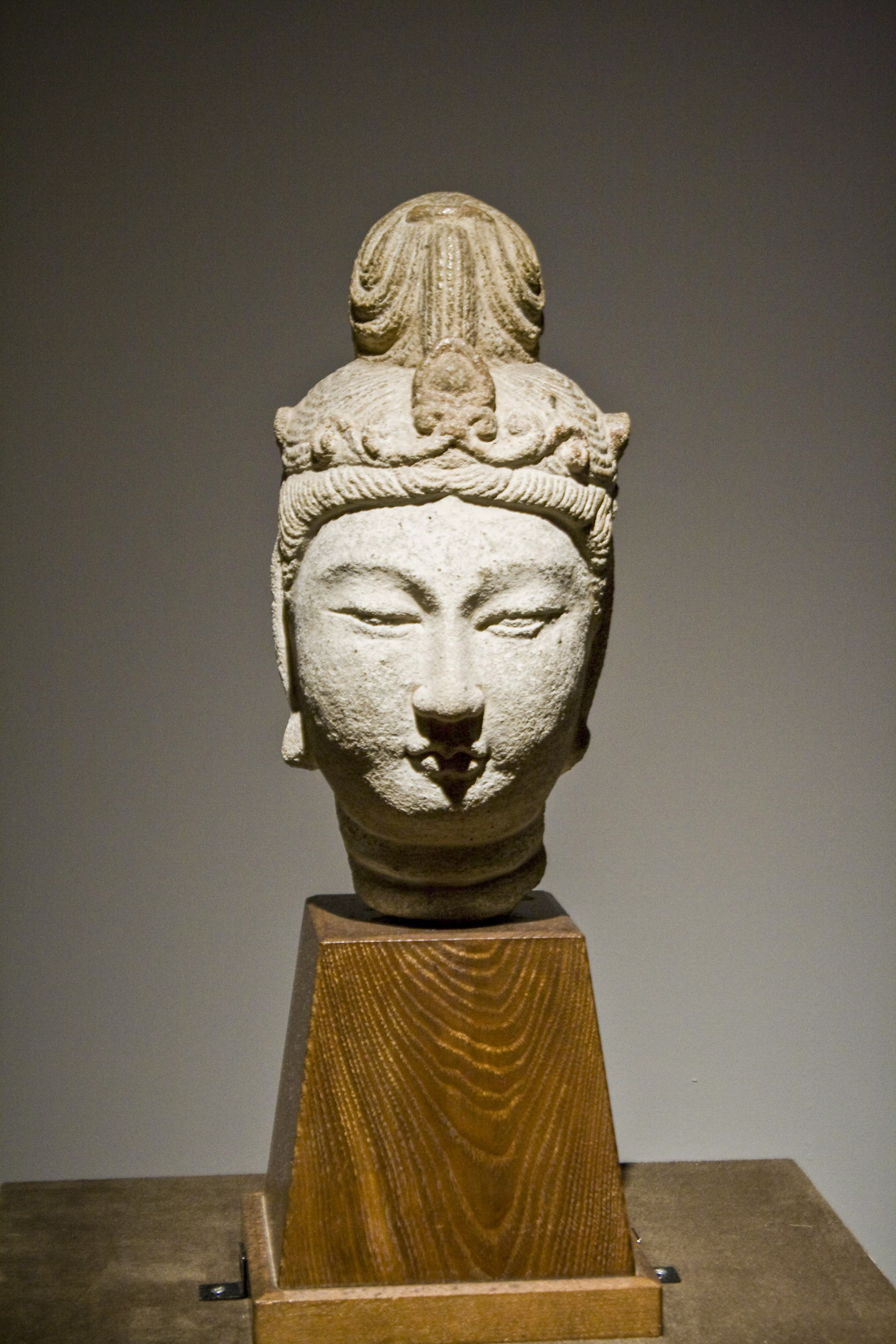
Granite head of bodhisattva. Unified Silla dynasty, South Korea.

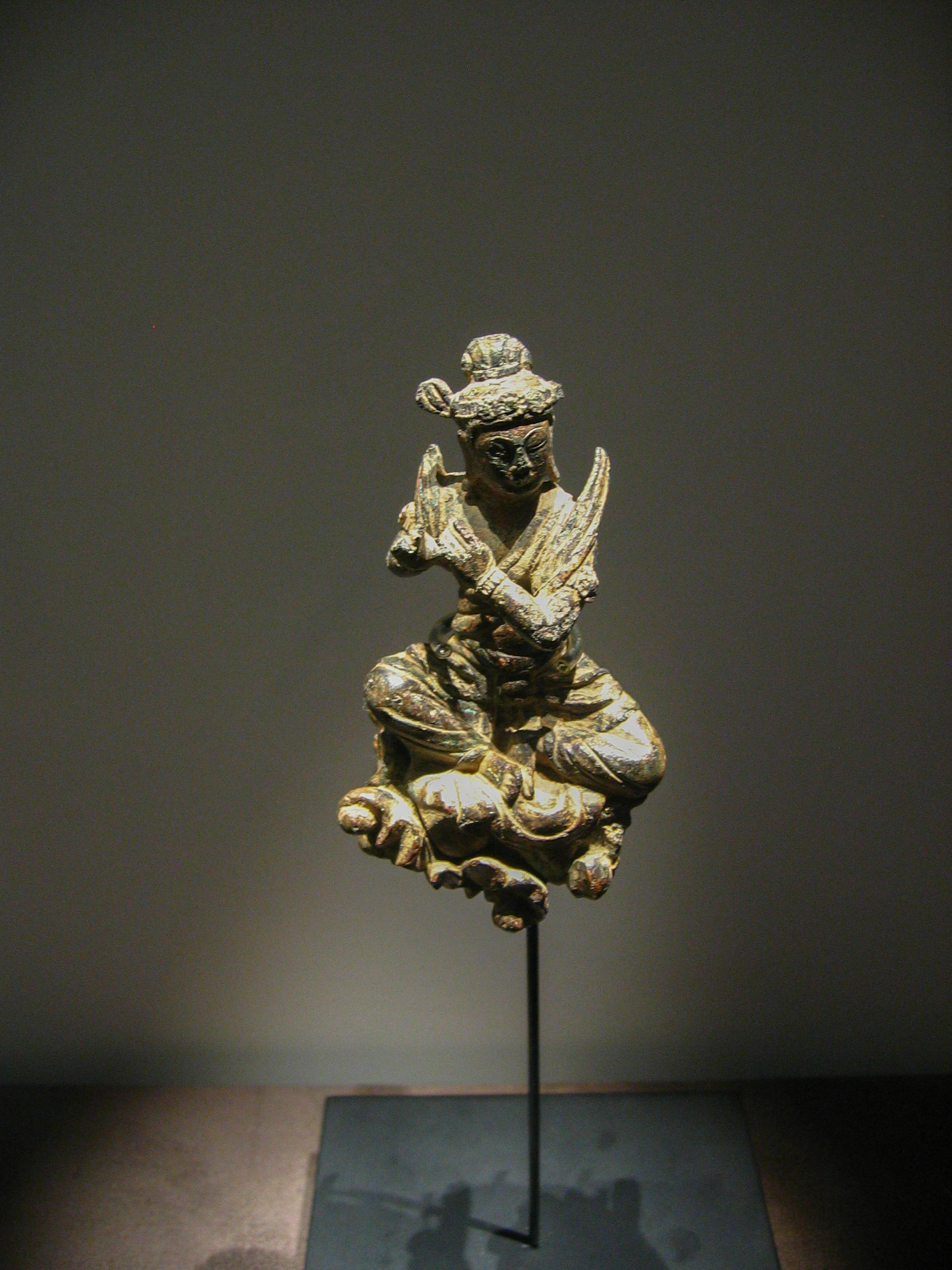
Seated Heavenly Musician Yugeumsa Temple. Unified Silla dynasty. Gilt-bronze, h. 12 cm. National Museum of Korea

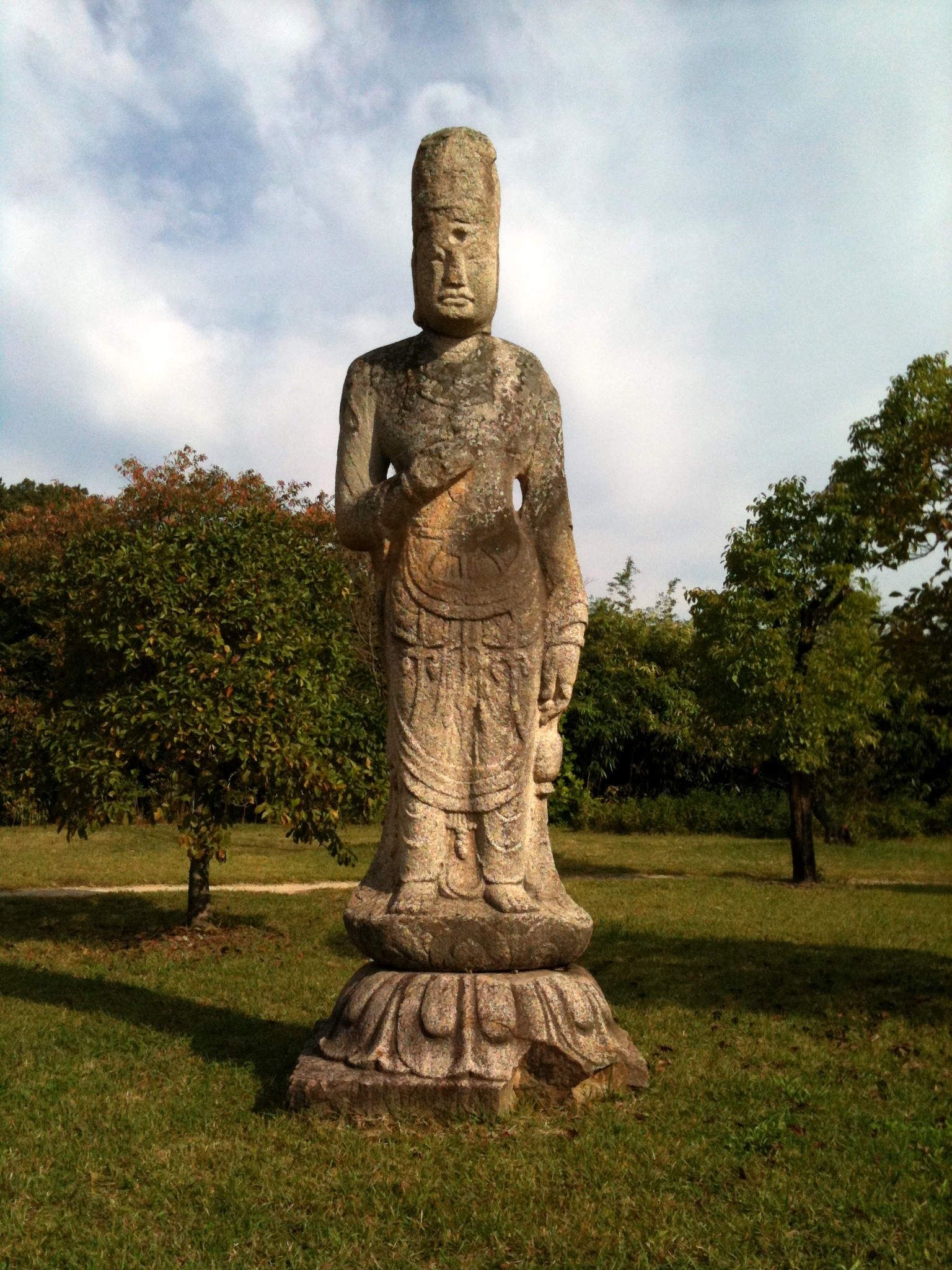

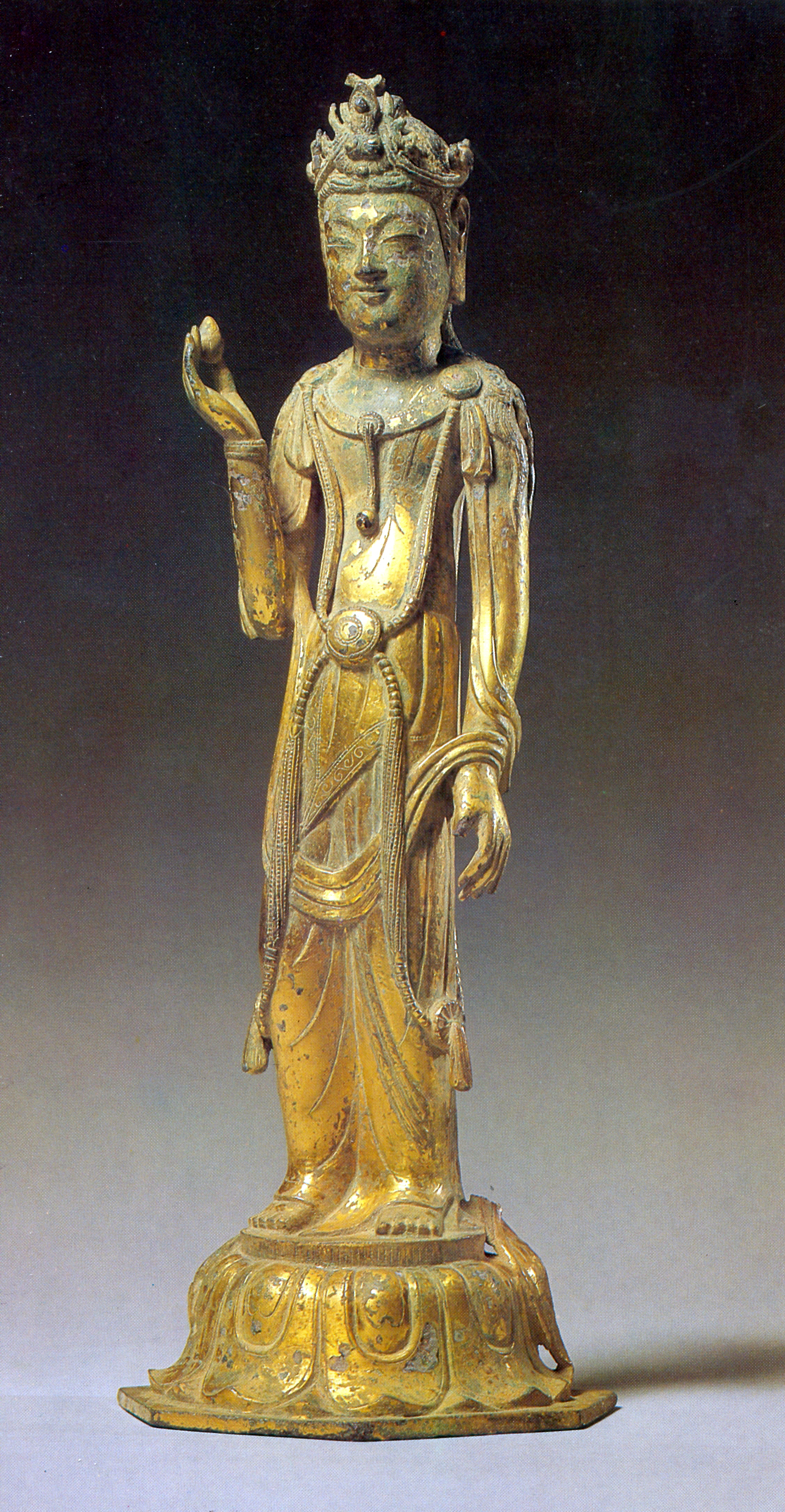
Standing Gilt-bronze Bodhisattva from Seonsan-eup in Gumi, Korea

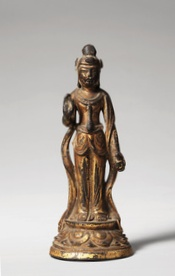
Gilt-bronze Standing Avalokitesvara Bodhisattva. 8th century, Unified Silla dynasty.

Guardians

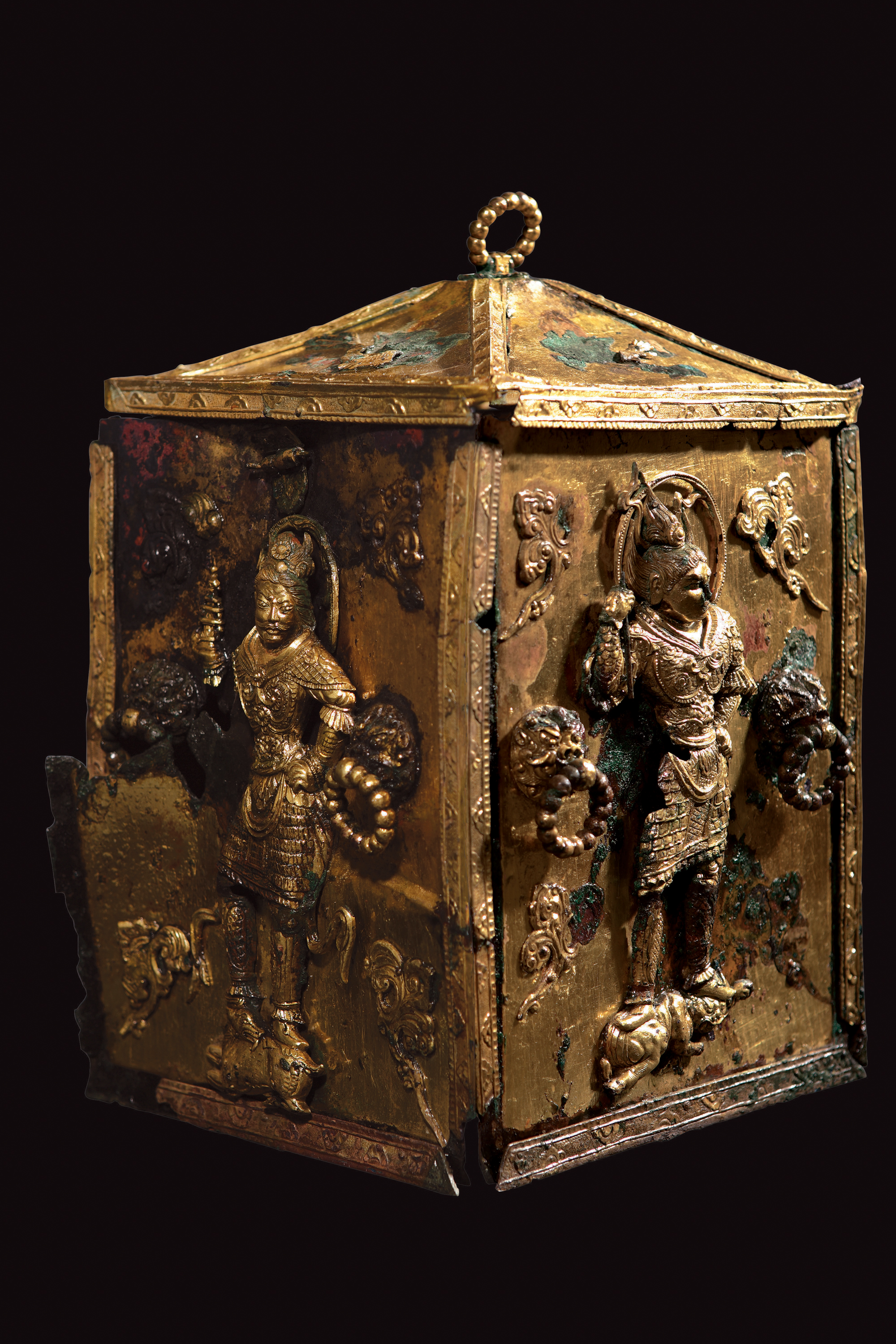
National Museum of Korea.

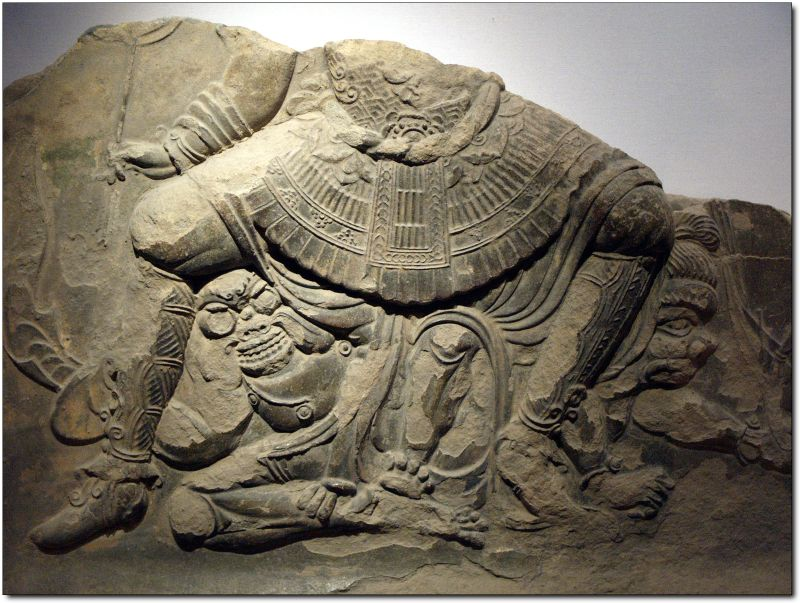
National Museum of Korea.

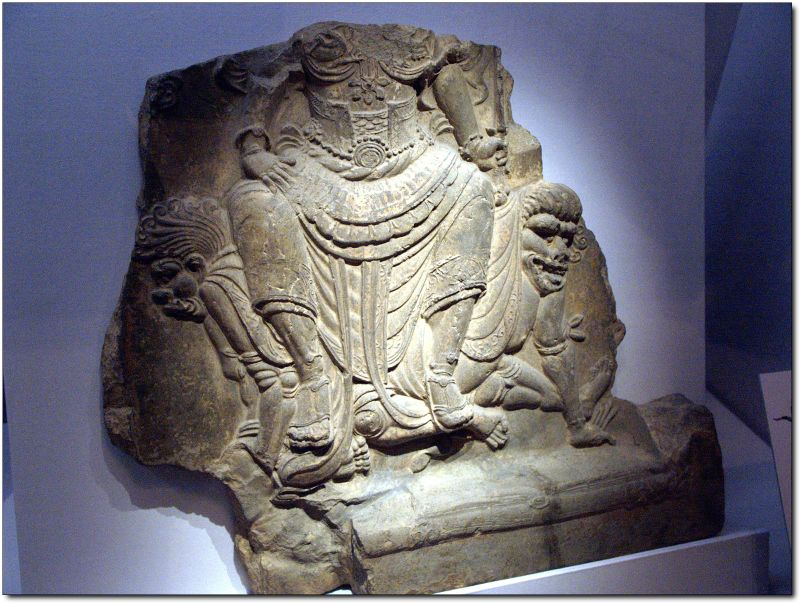
Direction guardian from Unified Silla at the National Museum of Korea.

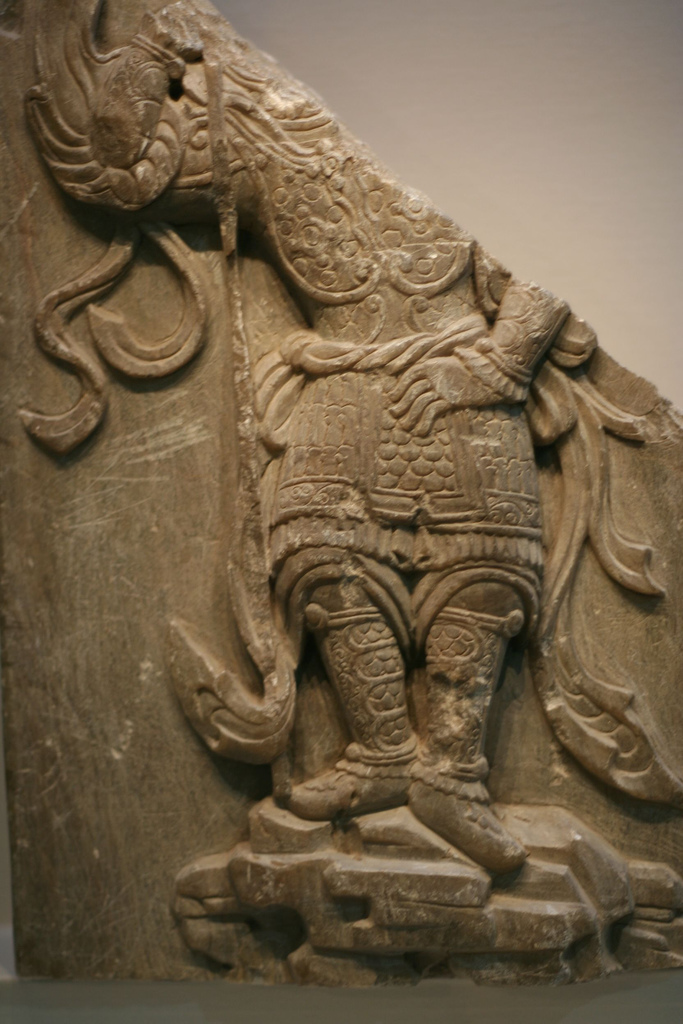

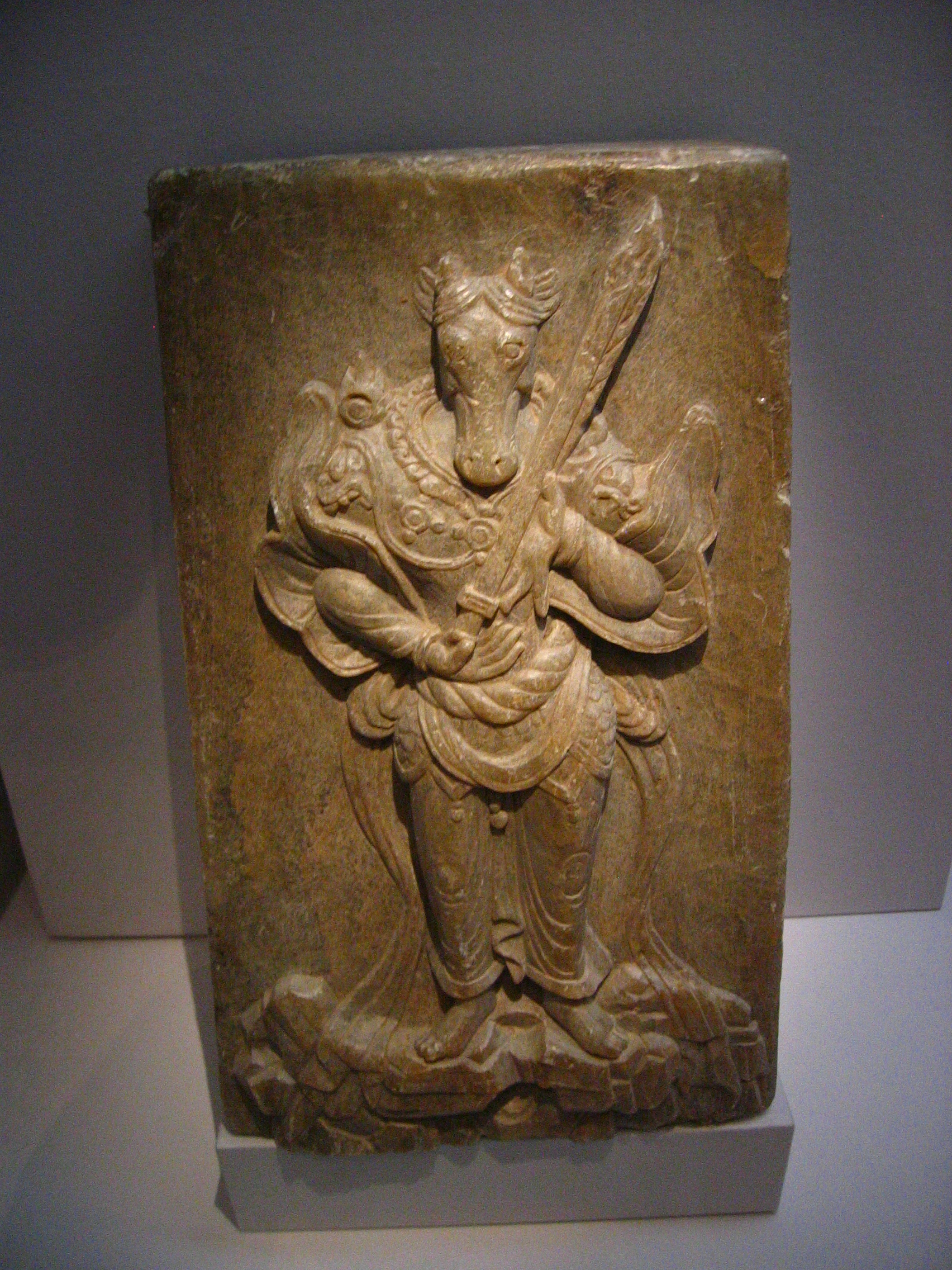

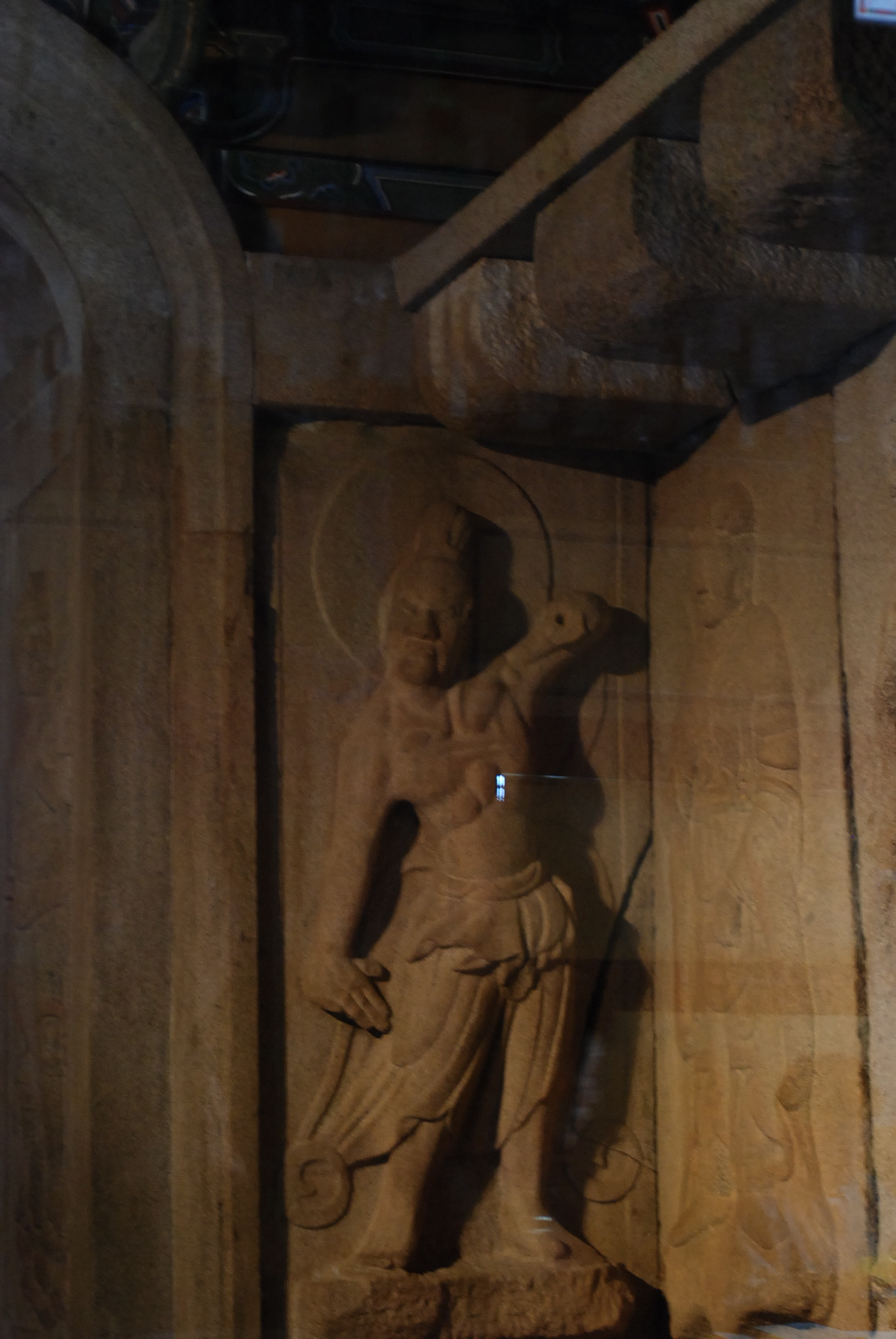
Guardian figure

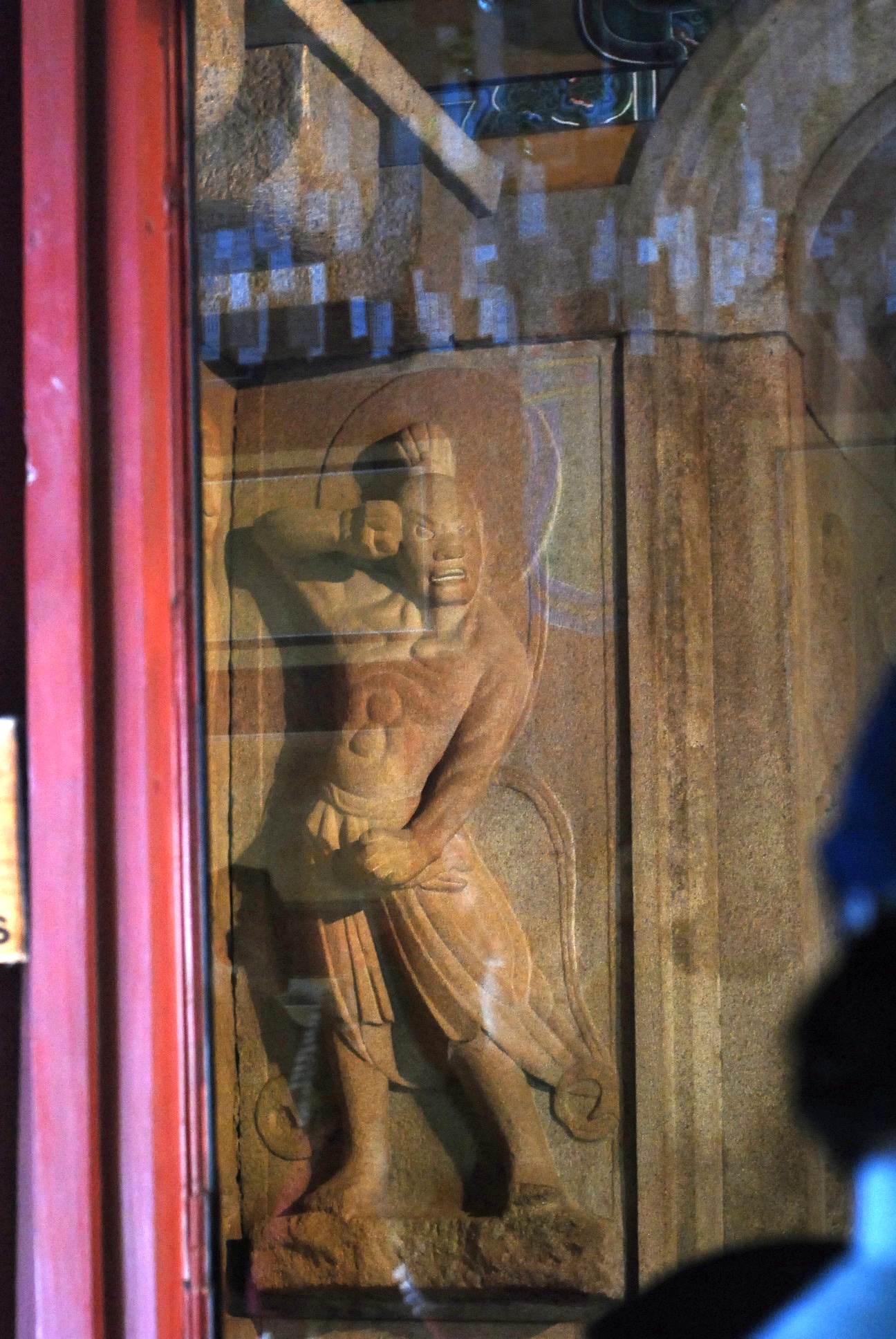
Guardian figure

=== Statues by material ===
Wood

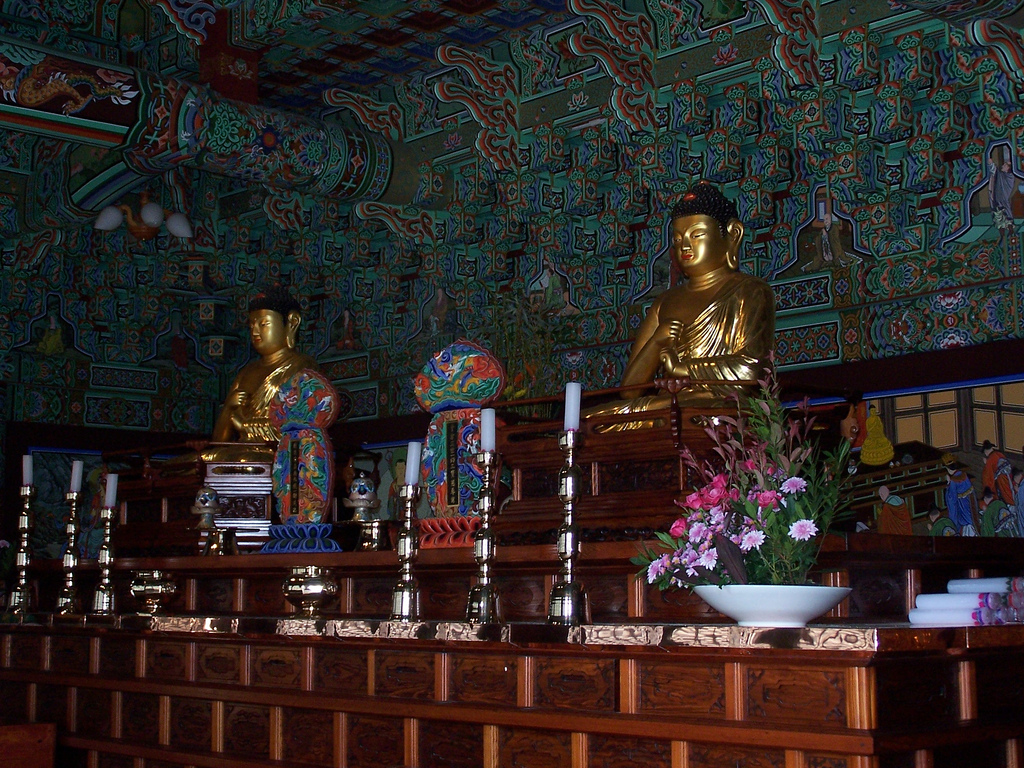
These two wooden Buddhas were recently rediscovered to be one of the oldest examples of wooden sculpture surviving from Korea. Haein Temple.

Metal

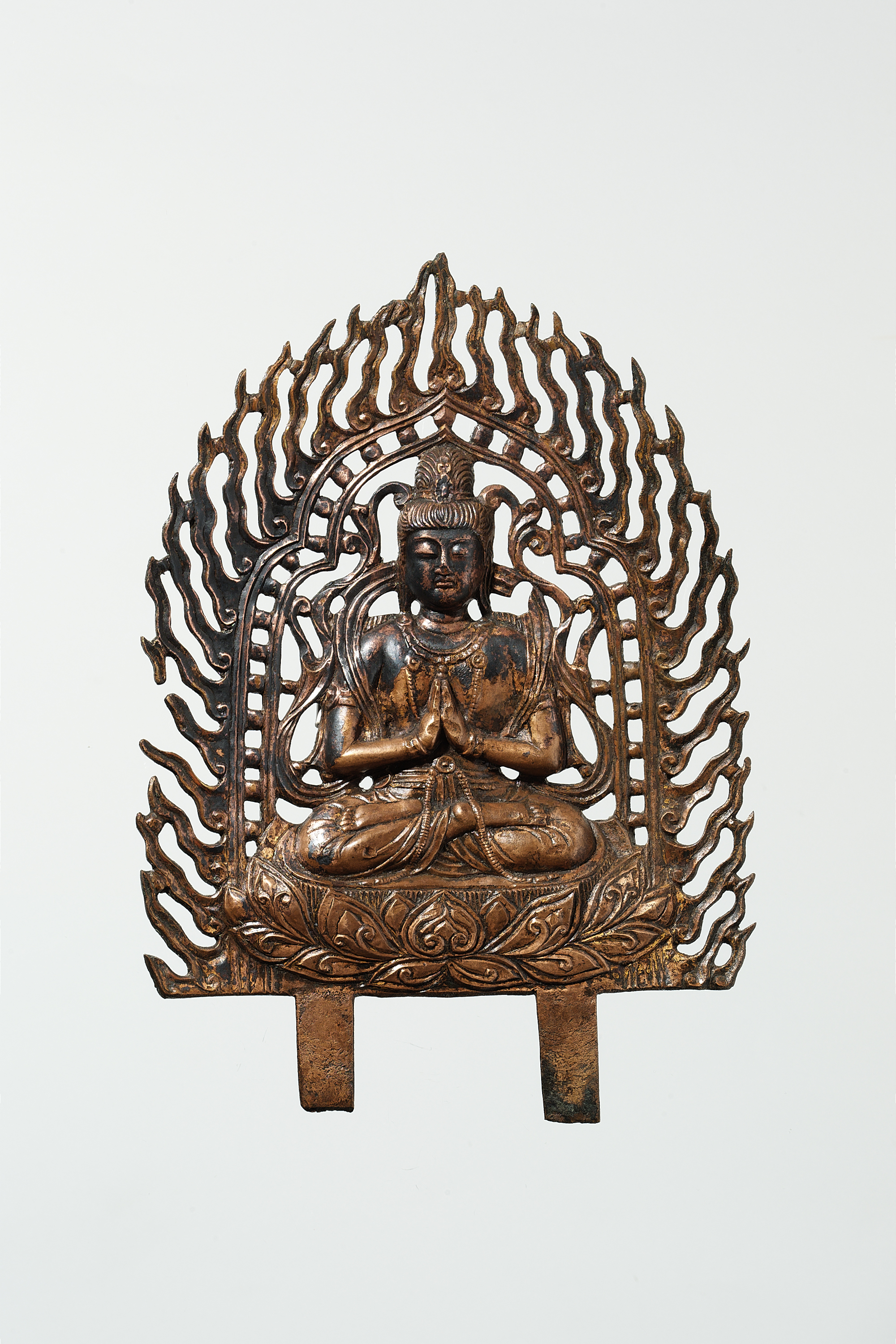
Unified Silla dynasty. Of the ten Buddha plates excavated from Wolji, Gyeongju. Two spikes of different lengths extend from the bottom of the pedestal, indicating that the plate was once fixed onto something.

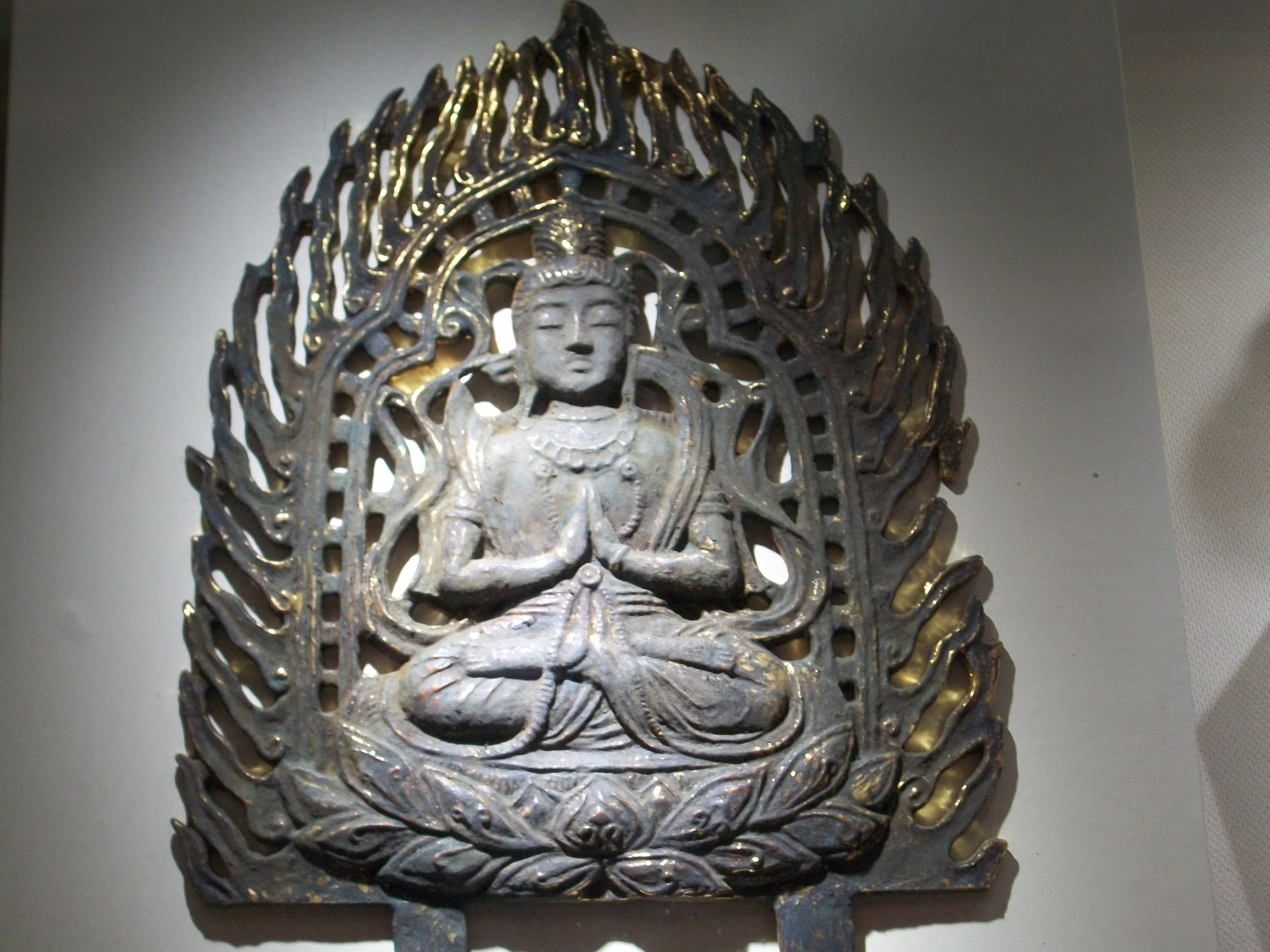

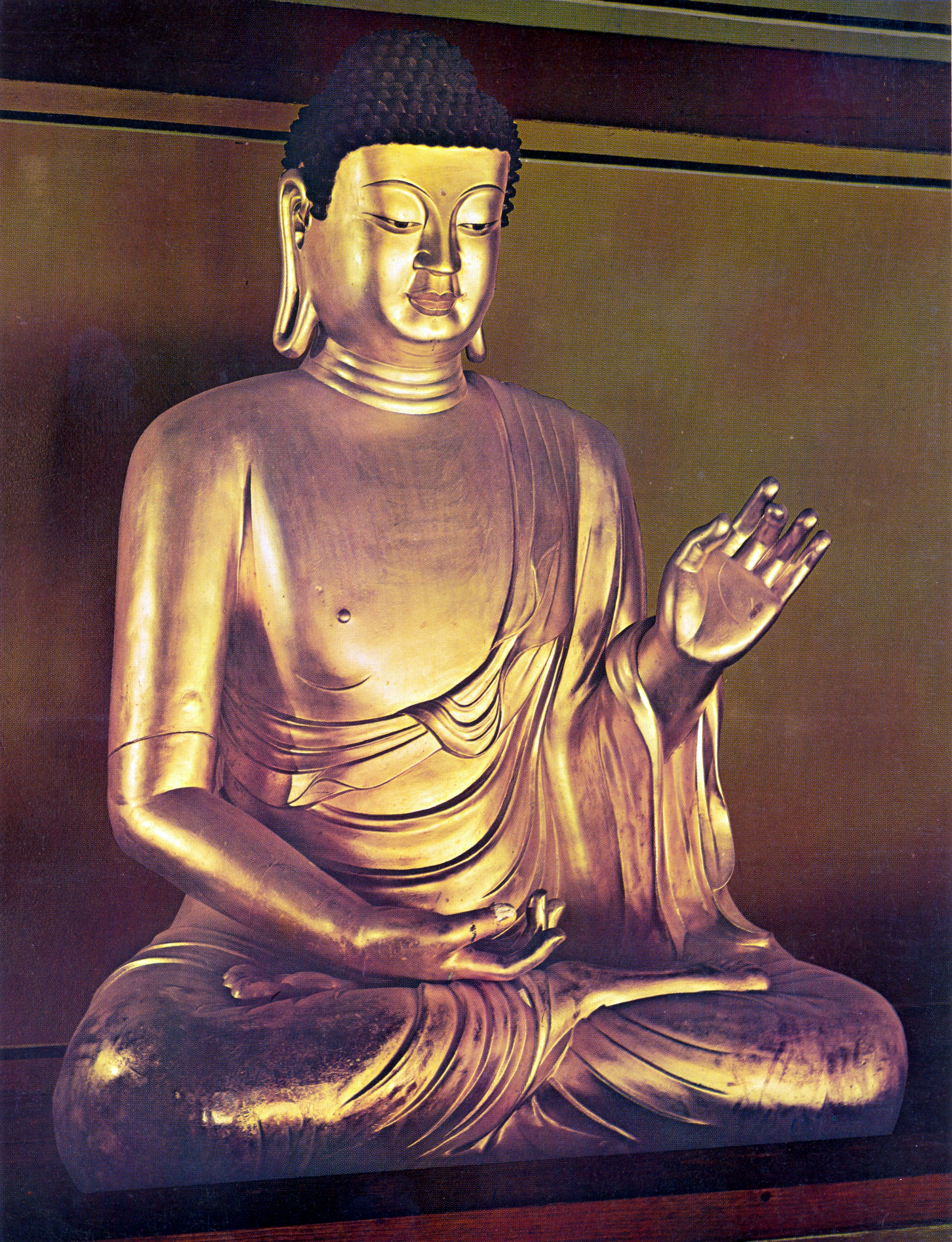
a South Korean national treasure, Gilt-bronze Amitābha at the Geungnakjeon Hall of Bulguksa Temple, Korea.

Stone(Granite)

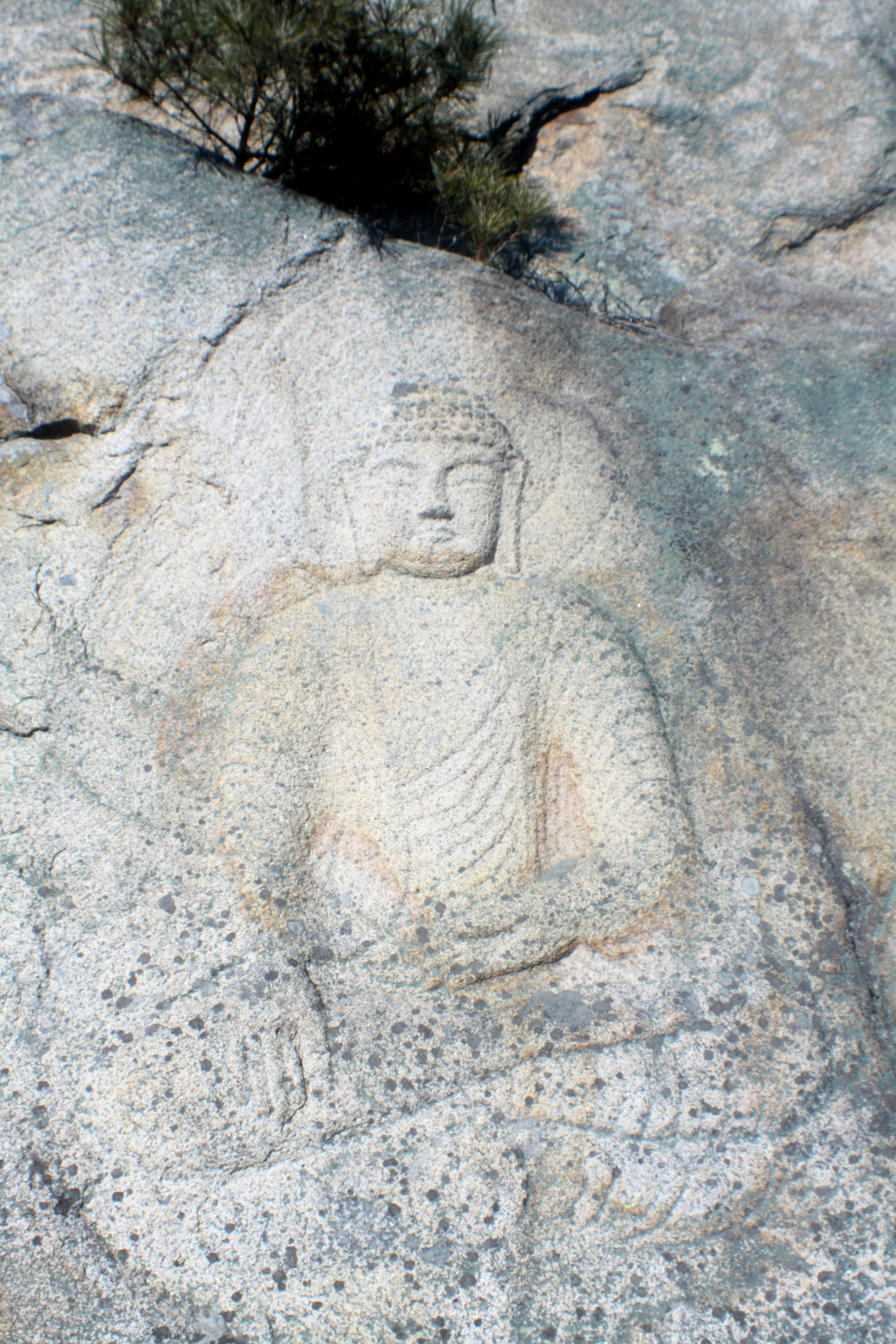
Seated stone Buddha statue Carved on the Rock at Yongjangsa temple site, Namsan Mountain in Gyeongju, Korea

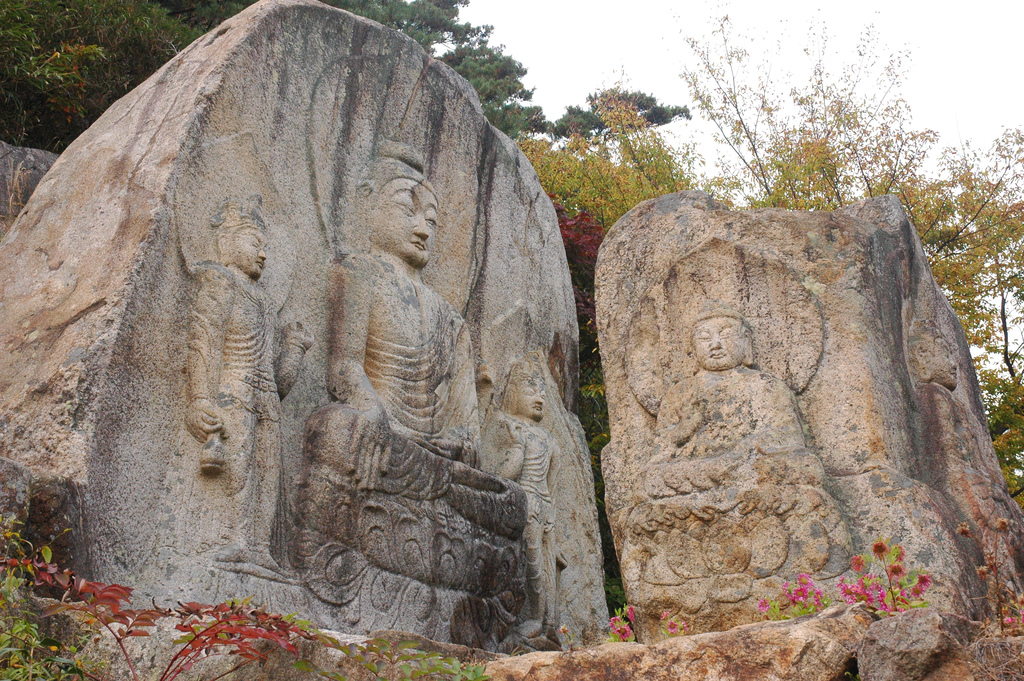
File:Rock-carved Buddhas at Chilbulam hermitage, Namsan in Gyeongju, Korea 03.JPG

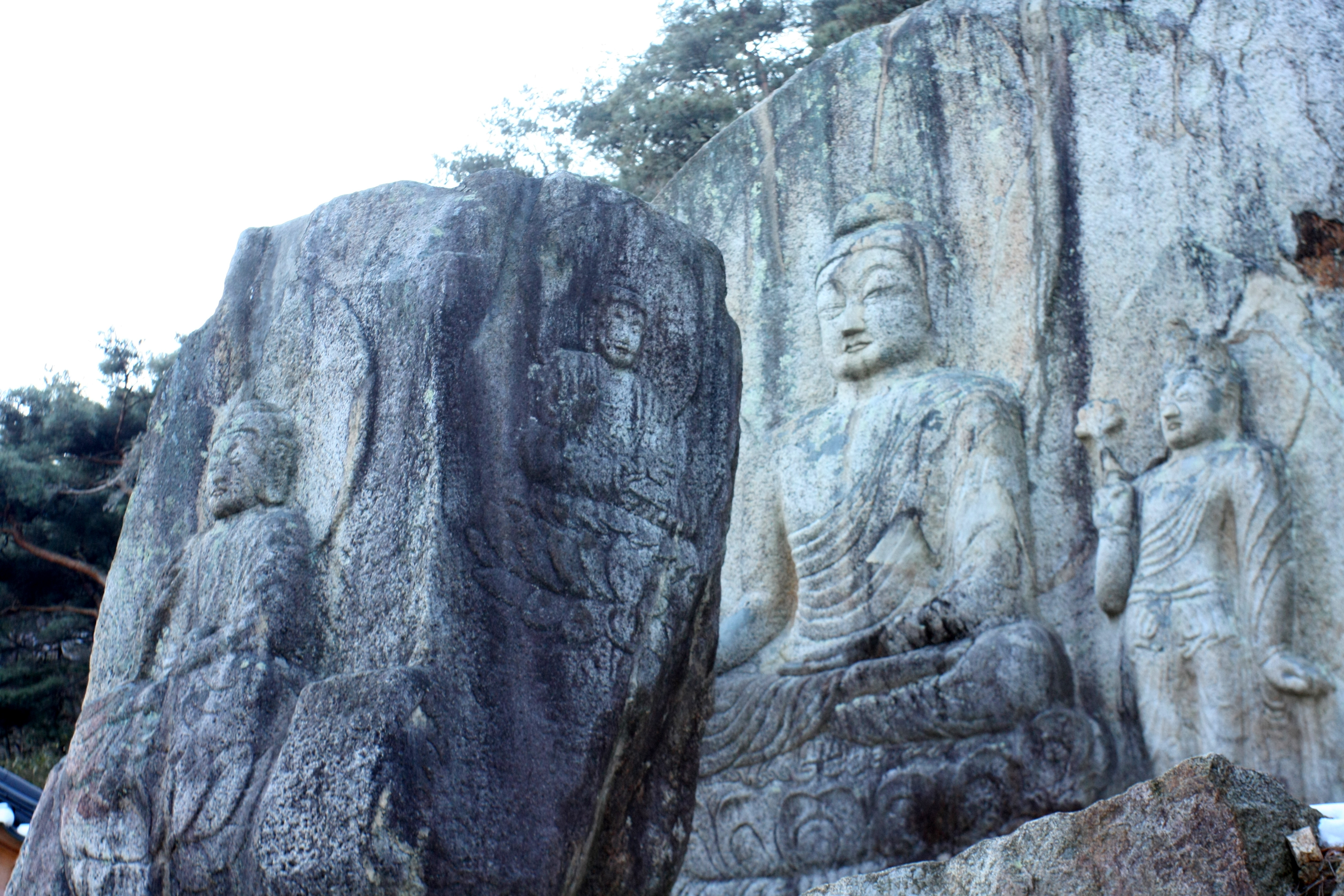

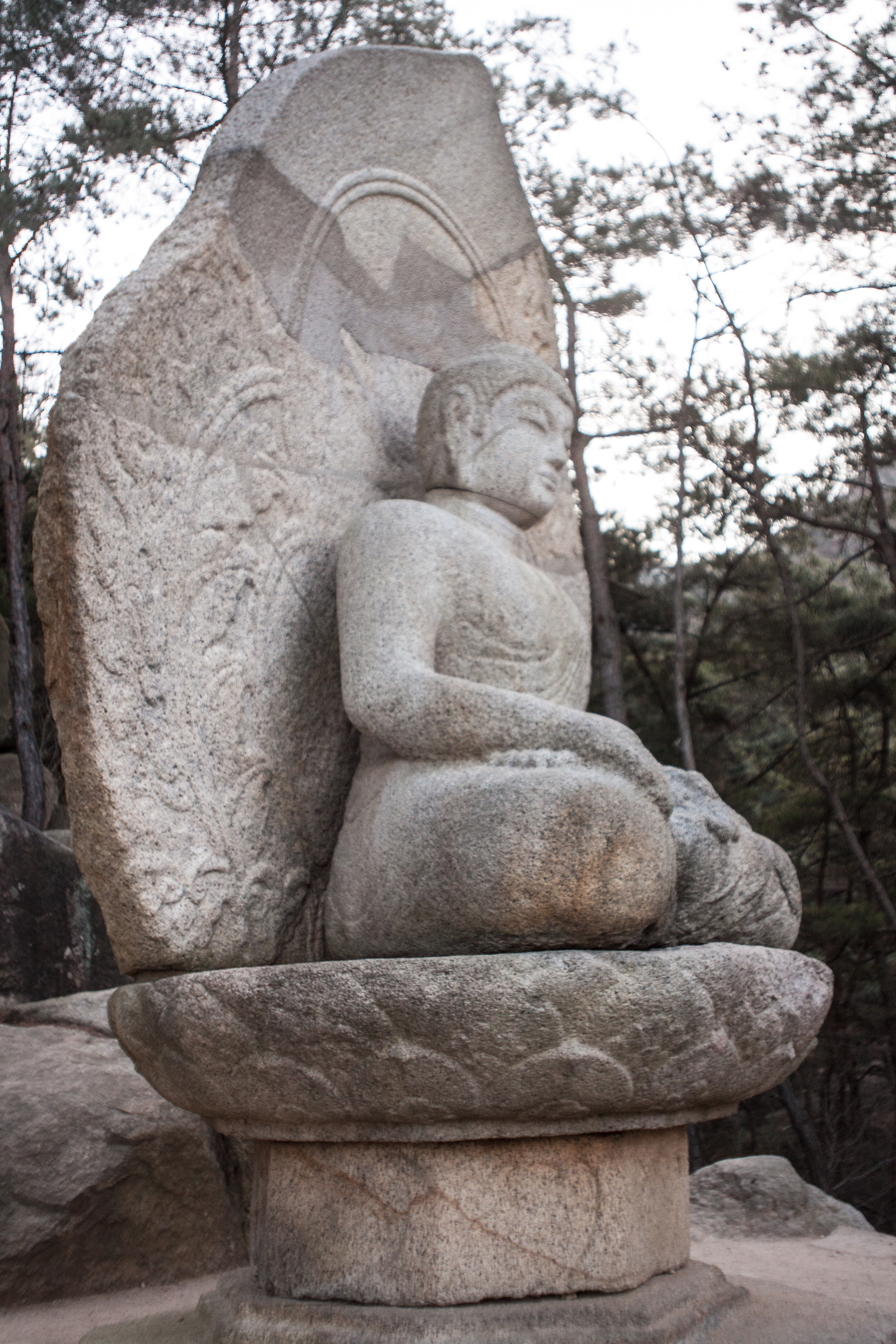
Seated stone statue of Buddha at Samneung-gye, Namsan in Gyeongju, Korea

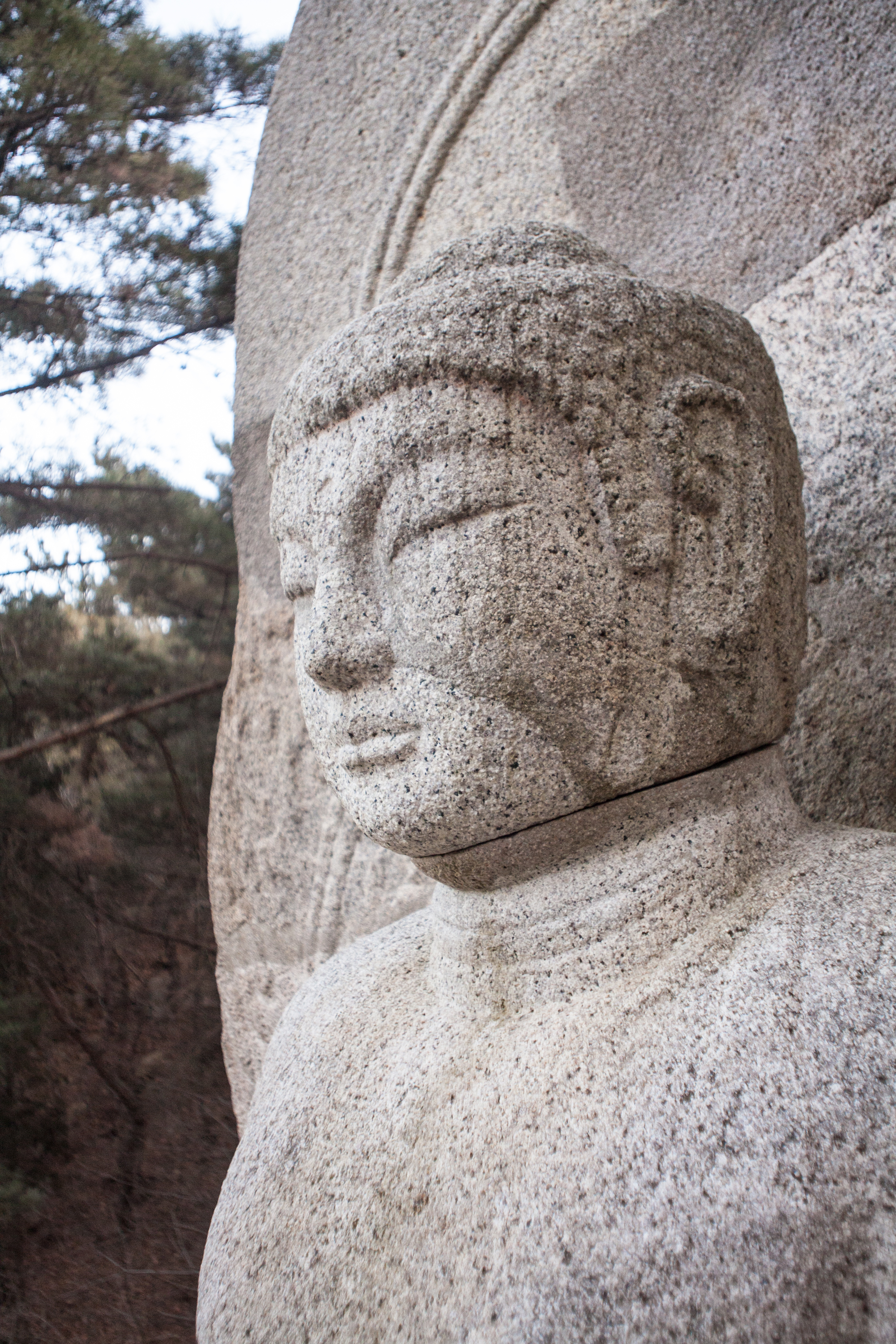

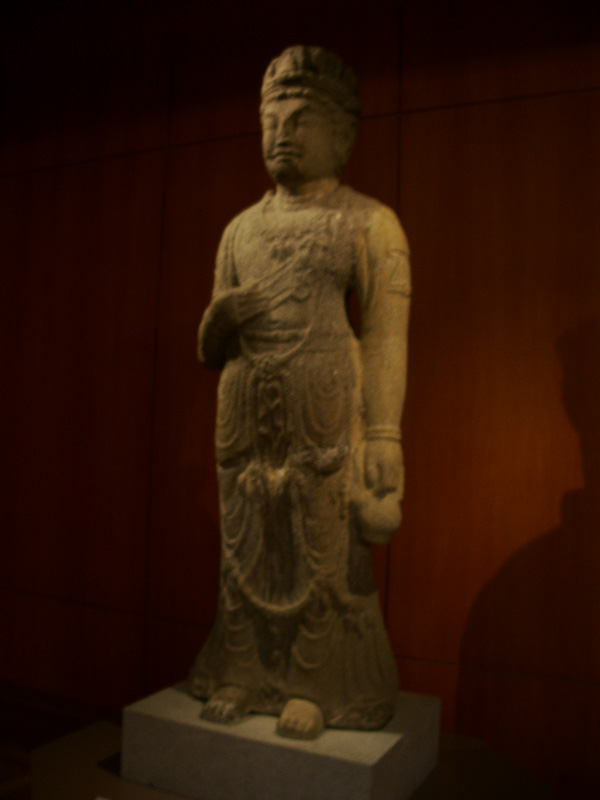
Guanyin, overwhelmed by the cries of the faithful, split her head open and grew ten extra faces, to better hear the cries, and this statue depicts Guanyin with eleven faces.

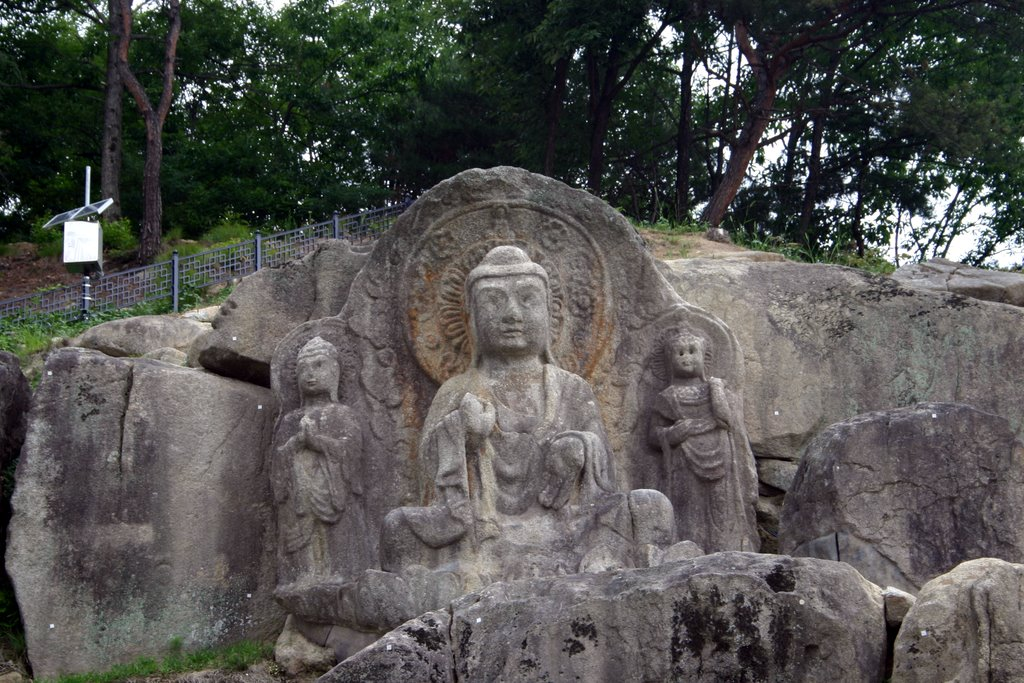

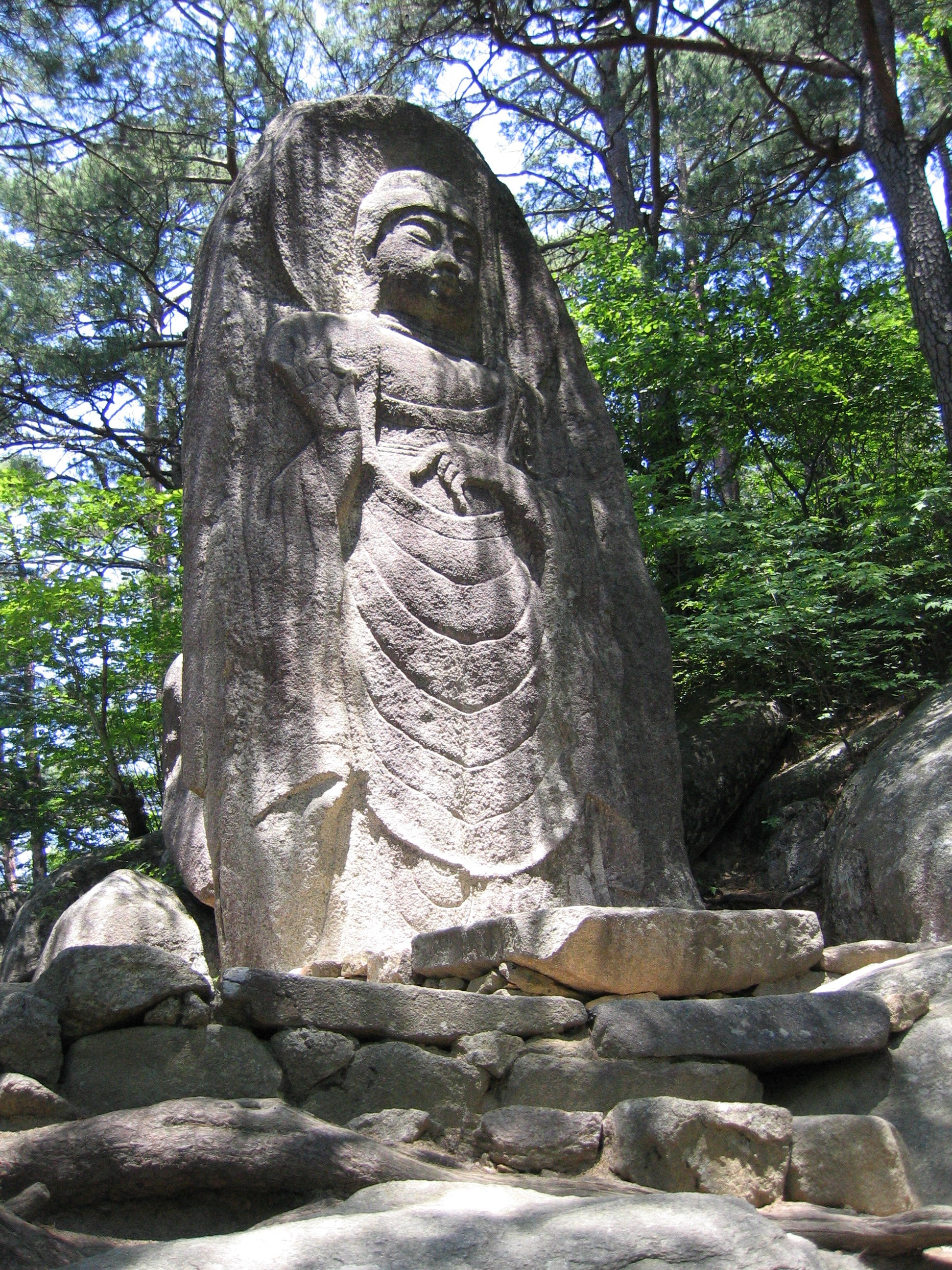
The carved image of the standing Buddha (마애불입상) on Gayasan, Hapcheon, South Korea.

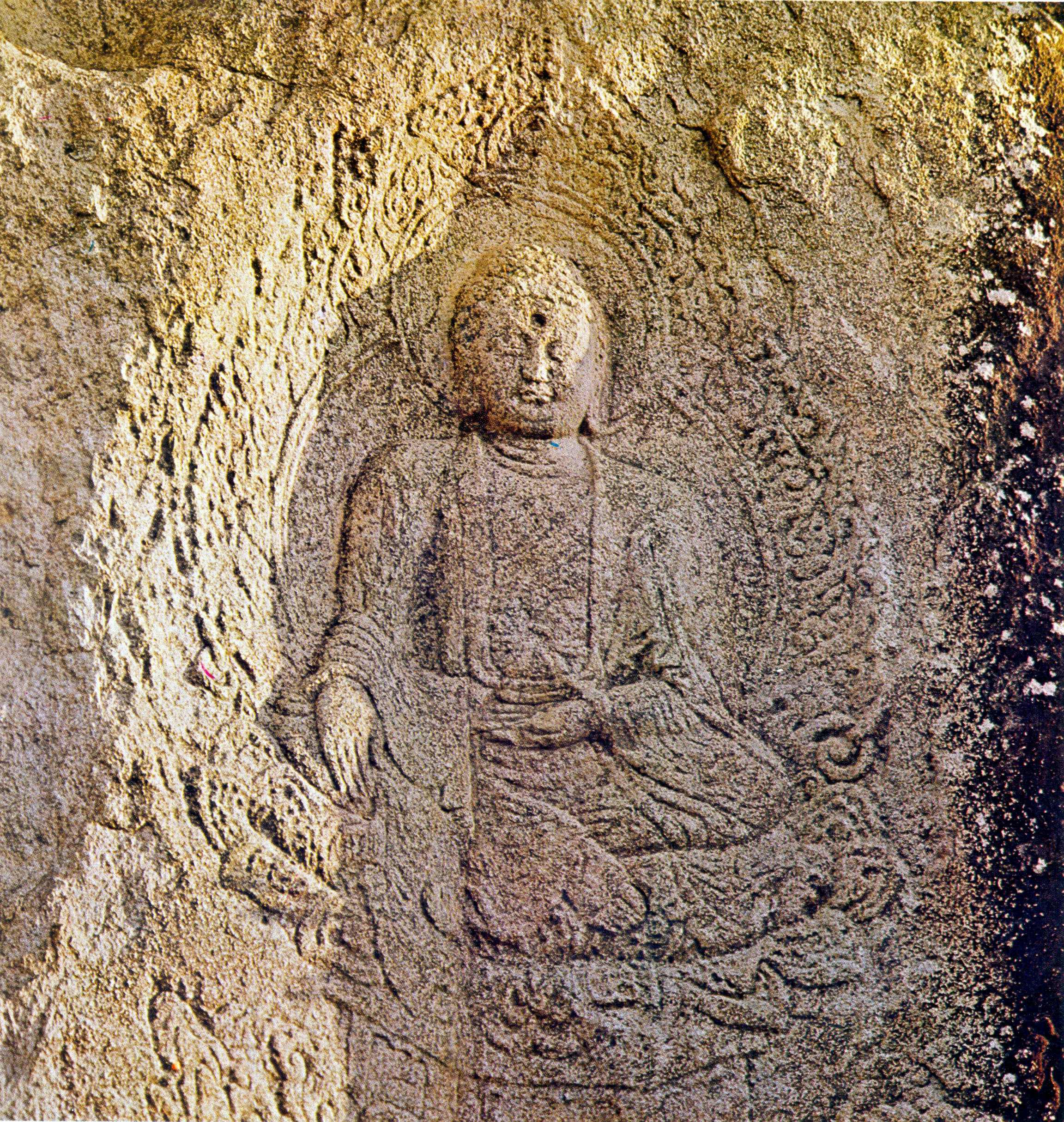
Seated Buddha carved on the Rock at Donghwasa temple in Daegu, Korea

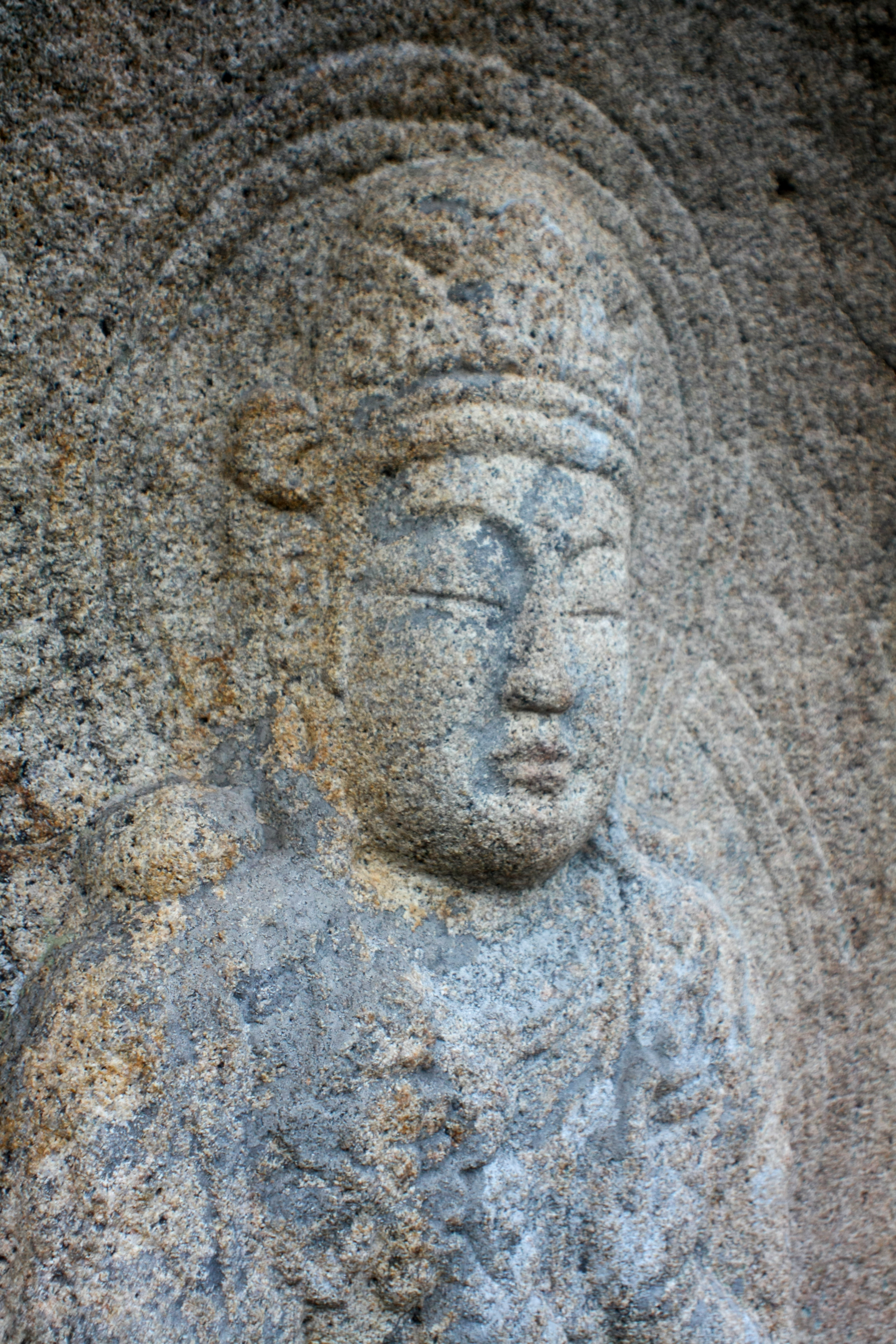
Rock-carved Bodhisattva in Half Lotus Position at Sinseonam Hermitage in Gyeongju, Korea

The Silla Kingdom, backed by the powerful Tang Empire, defeated the Baekje Kingdom in 660 and the Goguryeo Kingdom in 668 and ended centuries of internecine warfare in Korea. King Munmu then defeated and drove out the Tang armies successfully unifying most of Korea under the Unified Silla dynasty. The unification of the three kingdoms is reflected in some early Unified Silla sculptures.

After a period of estrangement with Tang China, diplomatic relations resumed and the so-called international style of the Tang heavily influenced Korea as it did much of the rest of Asia. Buddhism was heavily sponsored and promoted by the royal court. The early century of the Unified Silla period is known as a golden age of Korean history where the kingdom enjoyed the peace and stability to produce fabulous works of art. The central Buddha of the Seokguram Grotto, a UNESCO World Heritage Site, is recognized as one of the finest examples of Buddhist sculpture in eastern Asia.

However, the political instability and weakened monarchy of the late 8th century seems to have had an effect on artisans as Buddhist sculpture began to become formulaic and lose vitality in the use of line and form. During the later days of Unified Silla, iron was substituted as a cheaper alternative to bronze and was used to cast a number of Buddhas and one can see regional characteristics creeping into the style of sculptures as local warlords and strongmen began to break away from the orbit of the royal family in Kumseong (now modern-day Gyeongju).

After the destruction of the Baekje Kingdom, elements of Baekje style and early styles and later Tang Chinese influences affected Unified Silla art. The Korean Buddhist sculpture of this period can be identified by the "undeniable sensuality" of the "round faces and dreamy expressions" and "fleshy and curvaceous bodies" of extant figures. .

== Goryeo dynasty (918–1392) ==
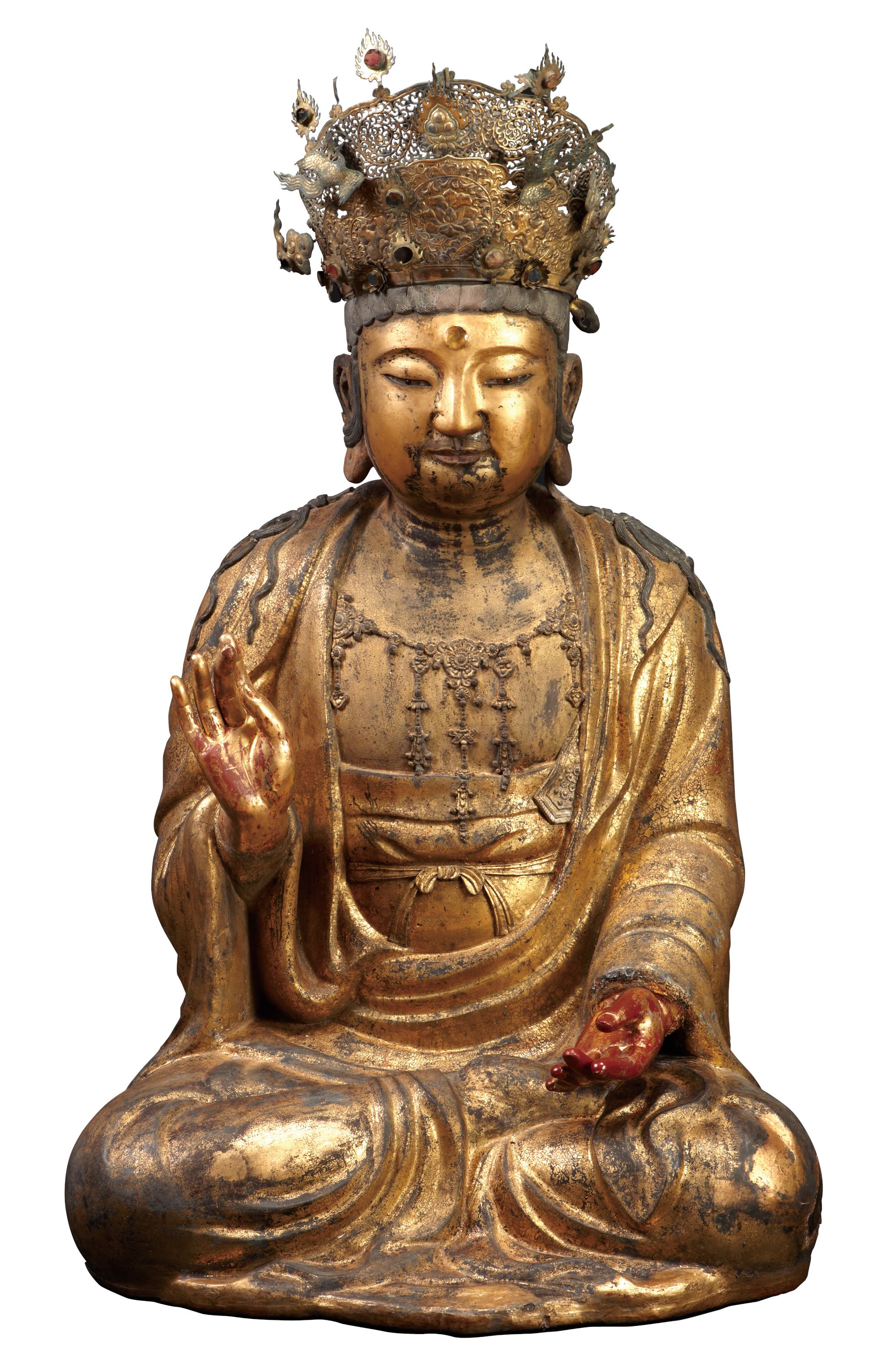
Seated Bodhisattva, Gilded wood, h. 126.0 cm. National Museum of Korea.

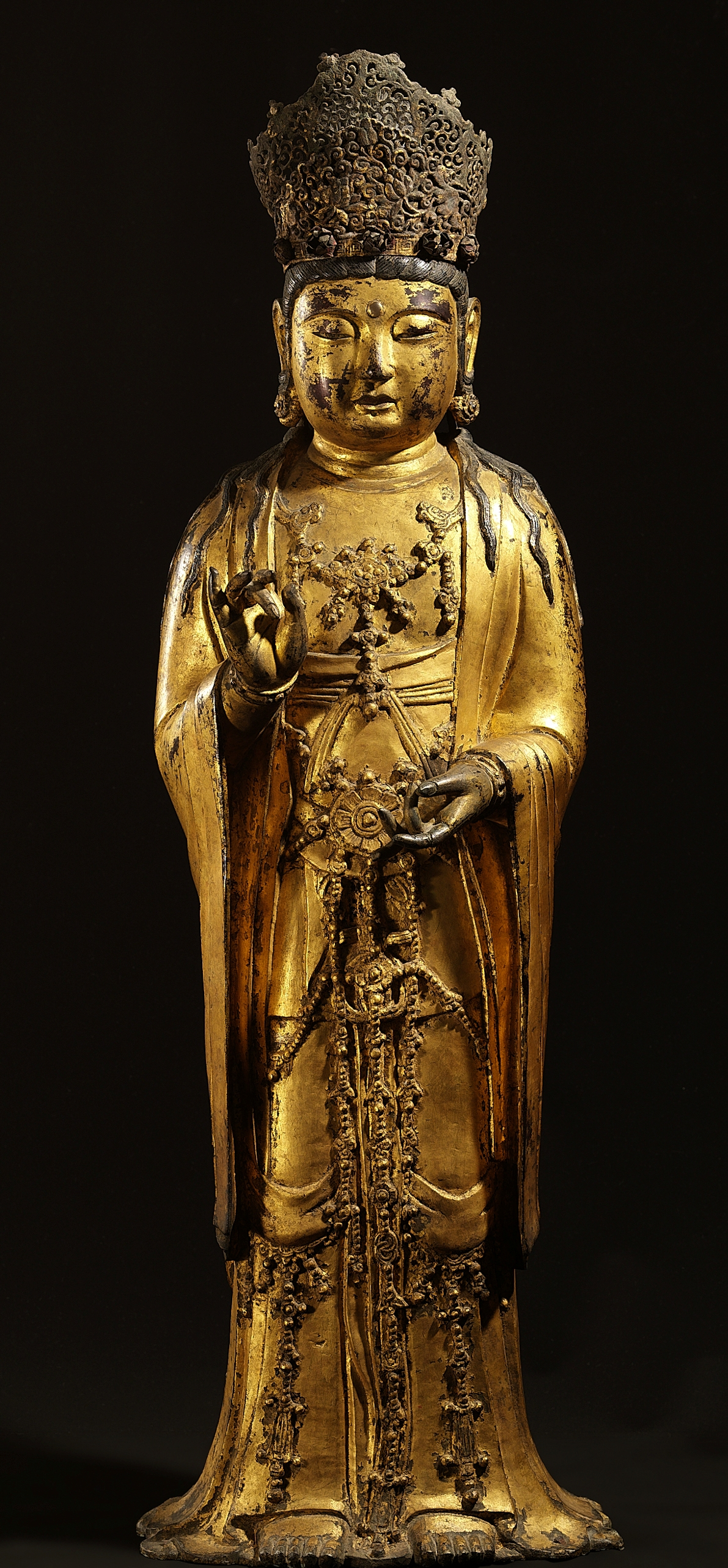
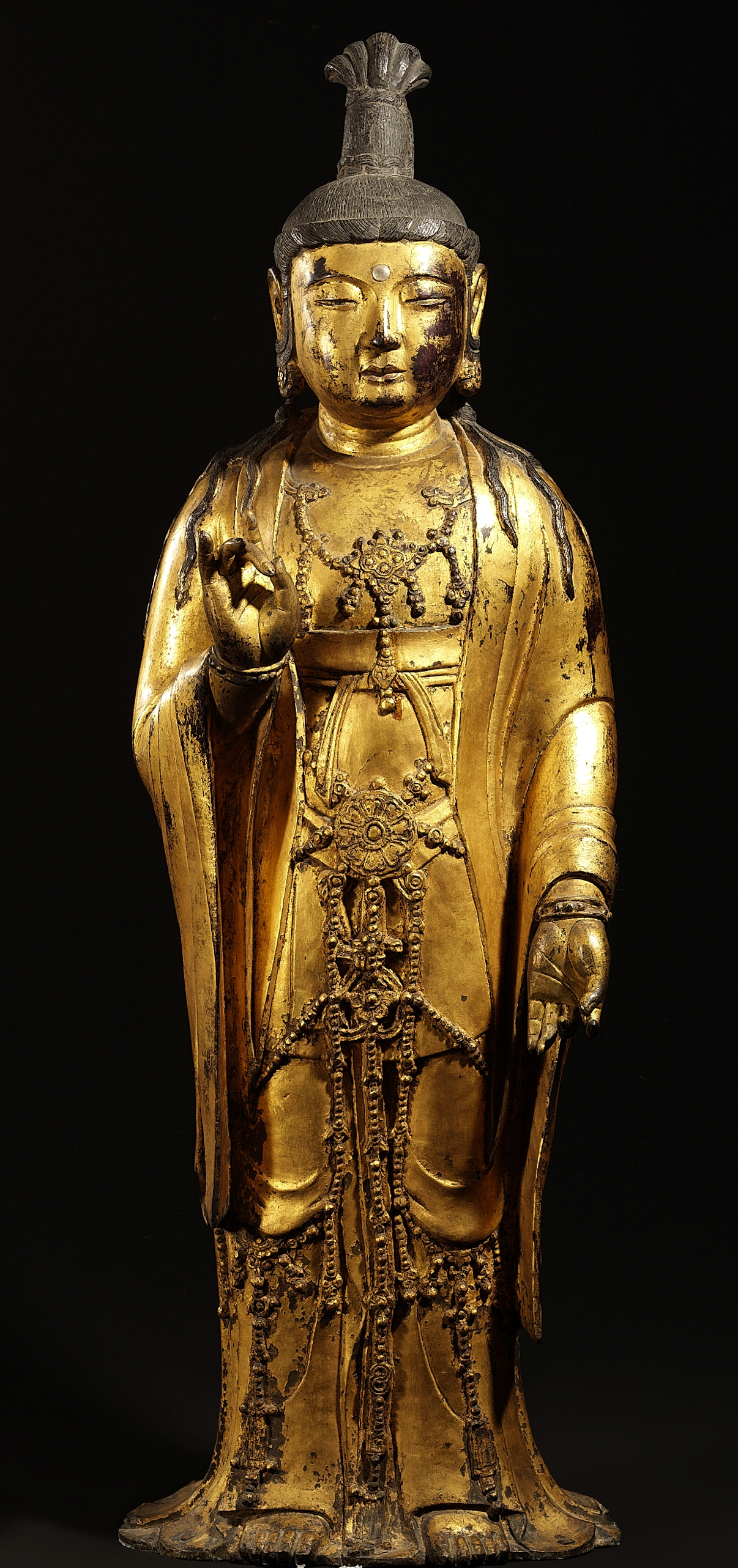
Two Standing Gilt Copper Alloy figure bodhisattvas, Goryeo period. h. 87.0 cm. National Museum of Korea.

The Goryeo dynasty succeeded Unified Silla as ruler of the Korean peninsula. Like their predecessors, the Goryeo court lavishly sponsored Buddhism and Buddhist arts. The early phase of Goryeo art is characterized by the waning but influential effect of Unified Silla prototypes, the discarding of High Tang style, and the incorporation of regionally distinctive styles which reflected the influence of local aristocrats who had grown powerful during the declining days of Unified Silla and also reflects the fact that the capital was moved from southeastern Korea to Kaegyong (now modern-day Kaesong).

The bronze life-size image of King Taejo, the founder of the Goryeo dynasty is technically not a Buddhist sculpture. However, the similarities of the statue to earlier bronze images of the Buddha, such as the elongated ears, a physical attribute of the Buddha, is suggestive of the relationship the royalty had with the religion.

One example of the lingering influence of Unified Silla art is the Seated Sakyamuni Buddha at the National Museum of Korea which can be dated to the 10th century. This statue is stylistically indebted to the central figure at Seokguram and some scholars suggest that the statue is from the Great Silla period. Both Buddhas employ the same "earth-touching" mudra which was first popularized in Korea by the Seokguram image. The fan-shaped folding of cloth between the legs of the Buddha, the way the clothing on the image was depicted, and the "cross-legged seated posture" are all typical of Unified Silla sculpture. The Buddha is the largest iron Buddha surviving in Korea. It was cast in multiple pieces and today one can see the different seams where the statue was pieced together. In the past the statue would have been covered in lacquer or gilt to hide the joints. The bottom of the nose, the ends of the ears, and the hands are reproductions and not part of the original statue.

The Eunjin Mireuk is example of early Goryeo sculpture demonstrating the rise of regional styles and the abandoning of a strict interpretation of the standard iconography of Buddhist images. The statue is believed to be a representation of the Avalokitesvara Bodhisattva, the Bodhisattva of Mercy, although it is popularly known as Maitreya. The statue is over 18 meters tall and took over 30 years to complete. The statue is valuable because it demonstrates developments unique to Chungcheong-do and Gyeonggi-do. Additionally, some scholars posit that these huge stones may have once been originally for Shamanistic practices and later subsumed into a Buddhist image.

Few reliably dated Buddhist sculptures from the 12th and 13th centuries have survived and so "it is difficult to assess the production of sculpture related to" the rising popularity of Seon Buddhism (Ch. Chan, Jp. Zen) and its association with the ruling military family of the mid-Goryeo period.

The seated Avalokiteshvara in "royal ease" pose from the 14th century at the National Museum of Korea shows the stylistic influence of Tibetan Lamaist Buddhism which was favored by the Yuan Mongol court. However, some scholars have suggested this statue is an import.

Early Goryeo (918–1170)

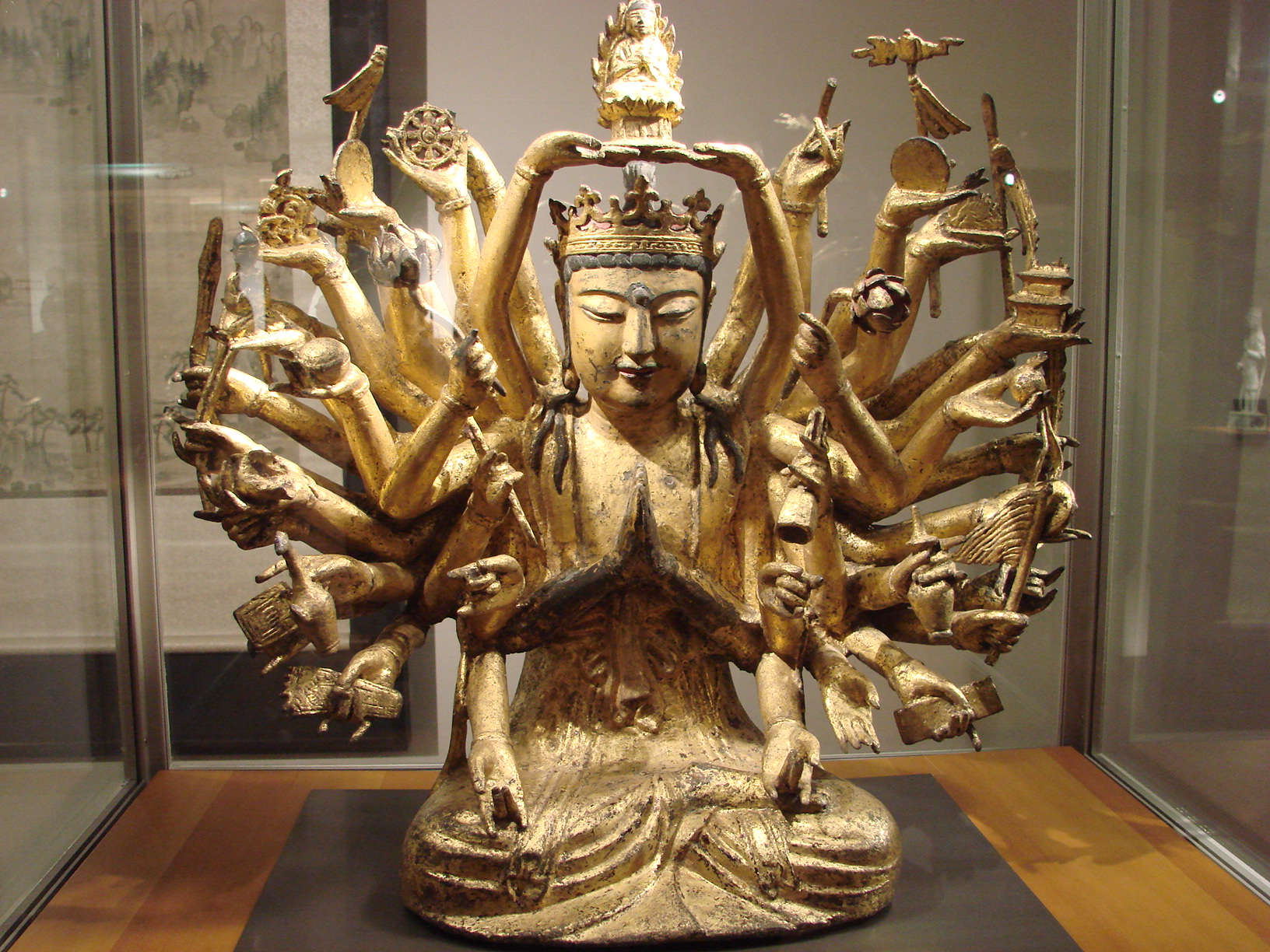
1000-armed Avalokiteshvara, 10th–11th century. Cast iron, h. 58 cm. Guimet Museum.

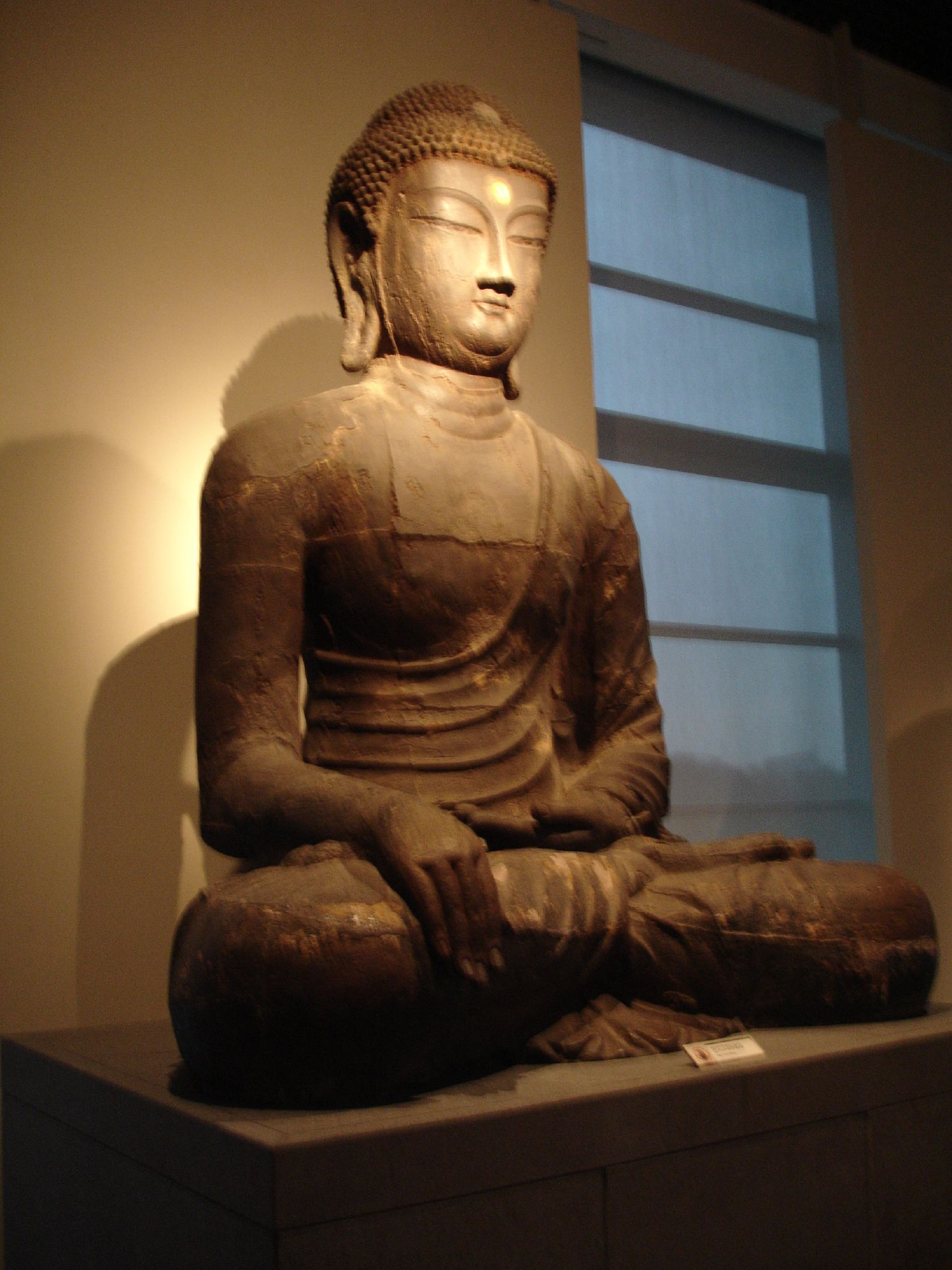
Seated Sakyamuni Buddha, 10th century. Cast iron, 2.88 m. National Museum of Korea, Treasure no. 332.

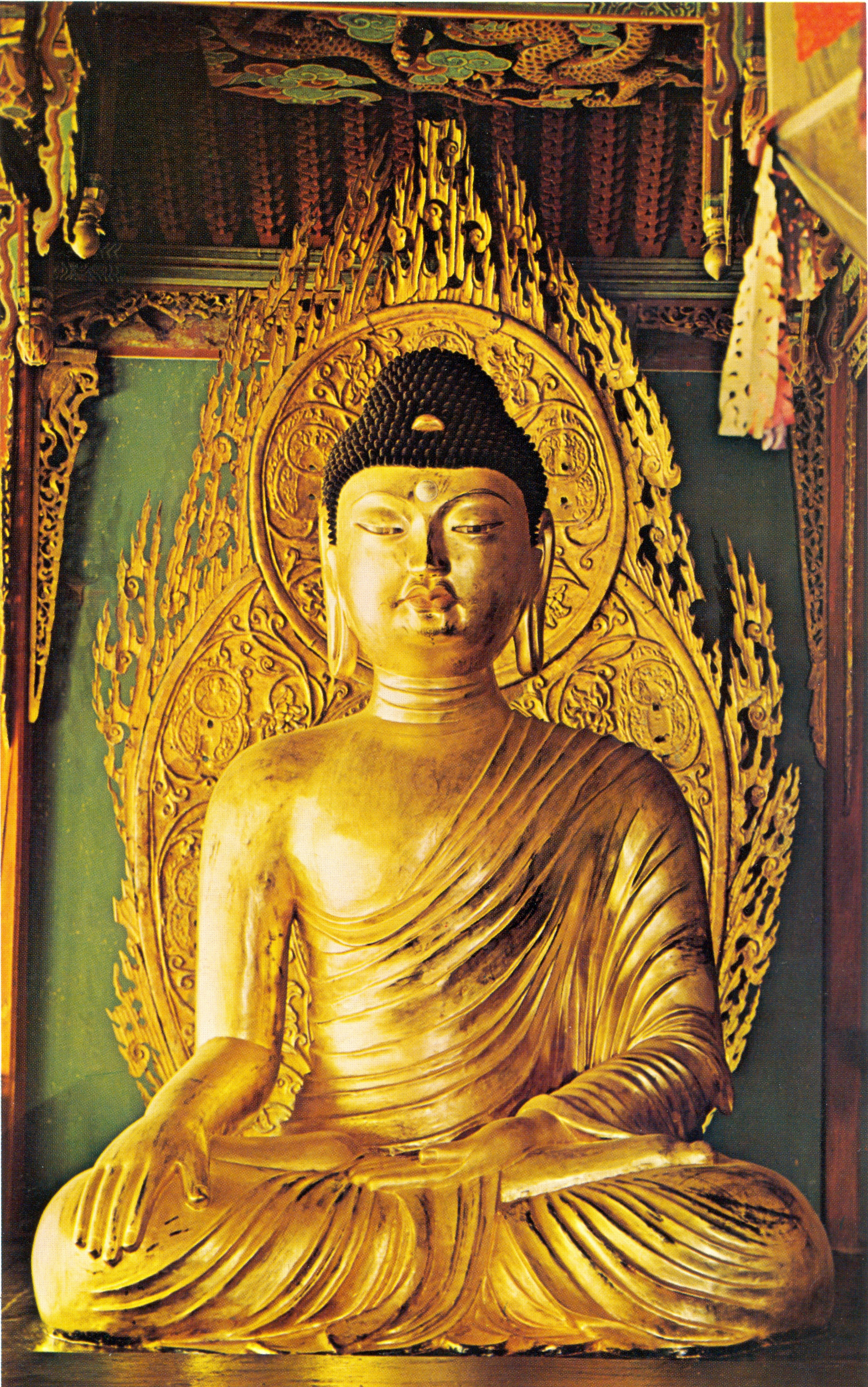
National Treasure no. 45. Seated Amitabha, clay, 2.78 m. Buseok Temple.

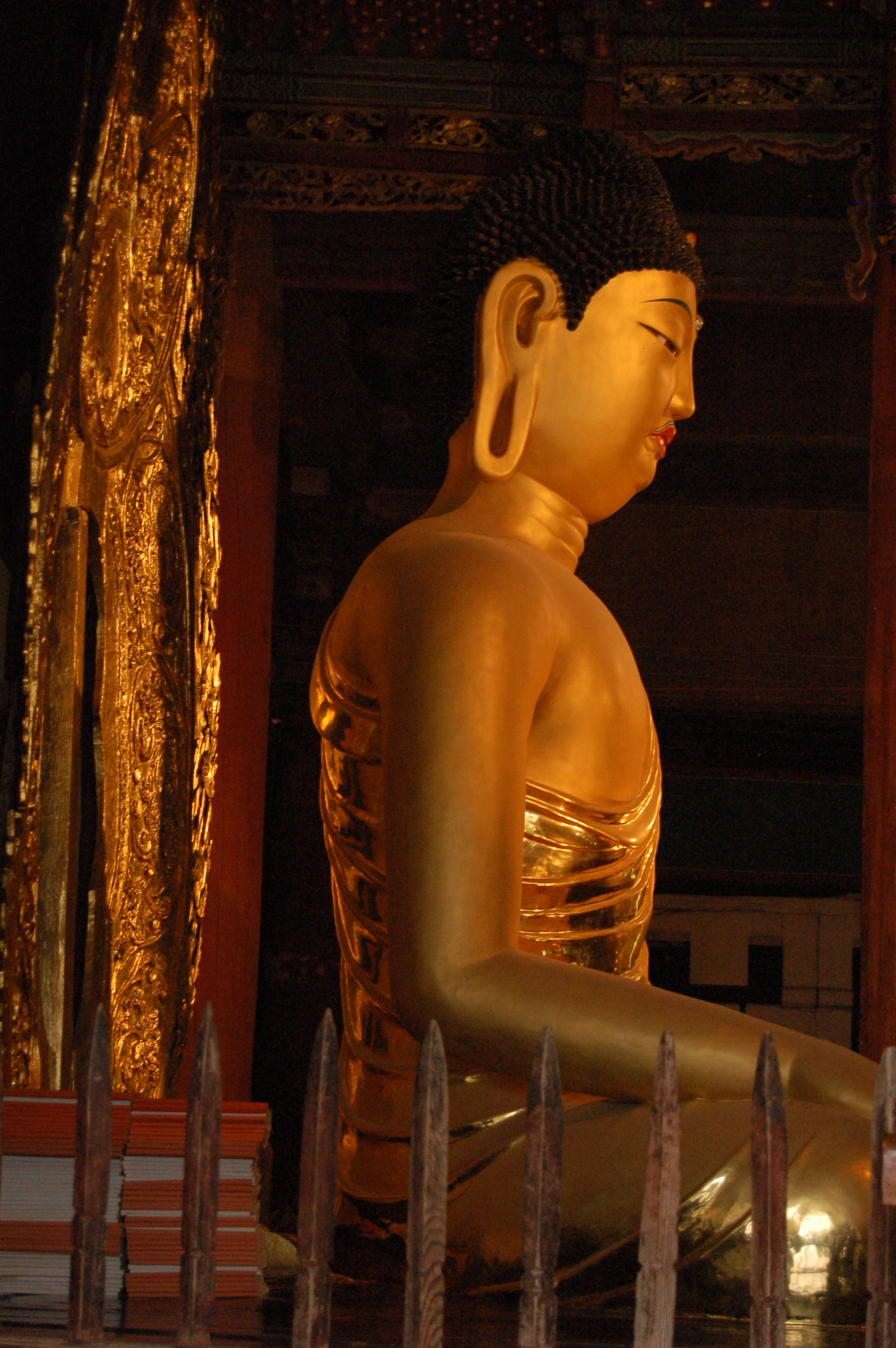

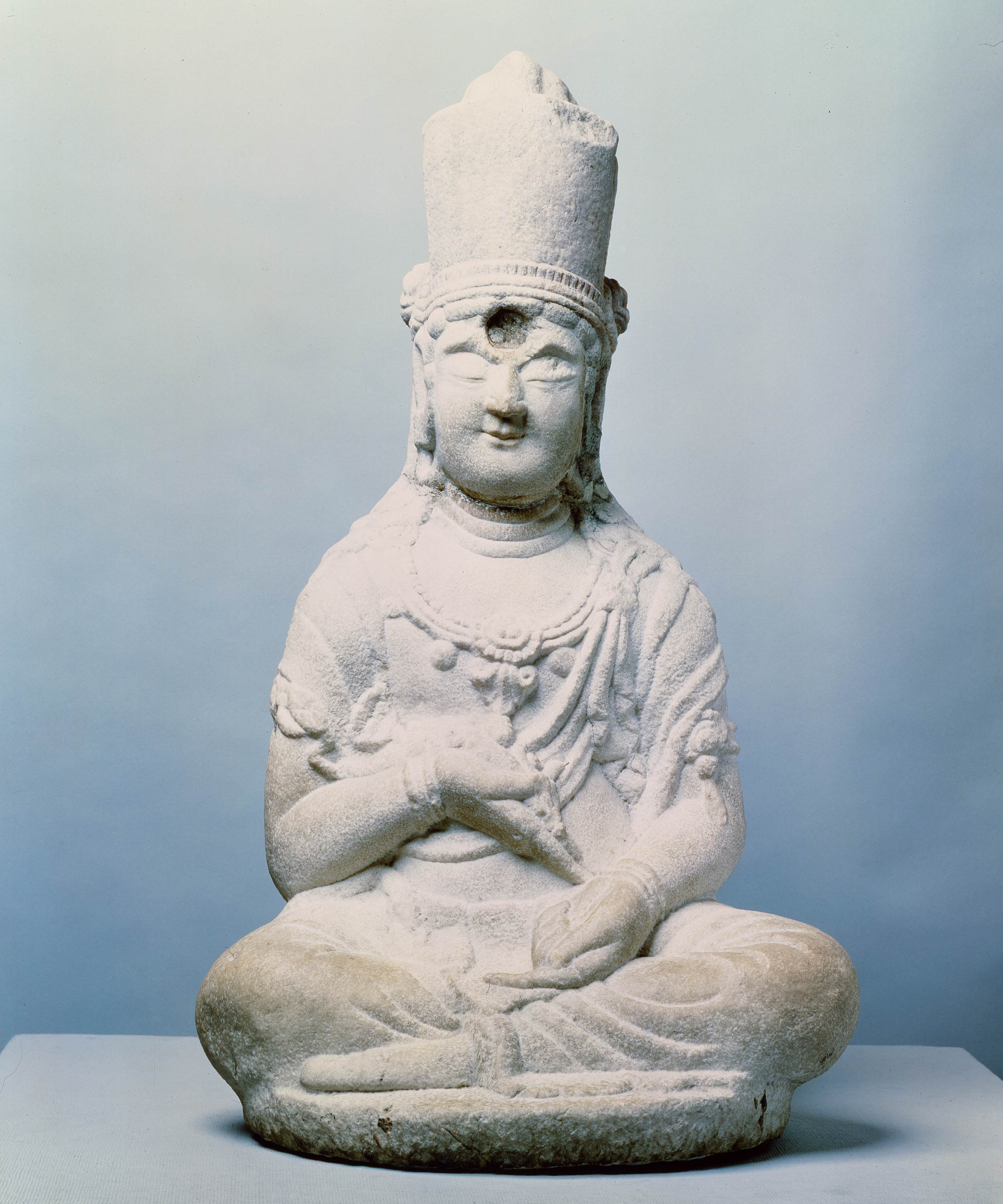
Culture/period: Goryeo dynasty. Provenance: Hansongsa Temple site, Namhangjin-dong, Gangneung-si, Gangwon-do. Materials: Granite. Dimensions: h. 92.4 cm. Designation: National Treasure No. 124

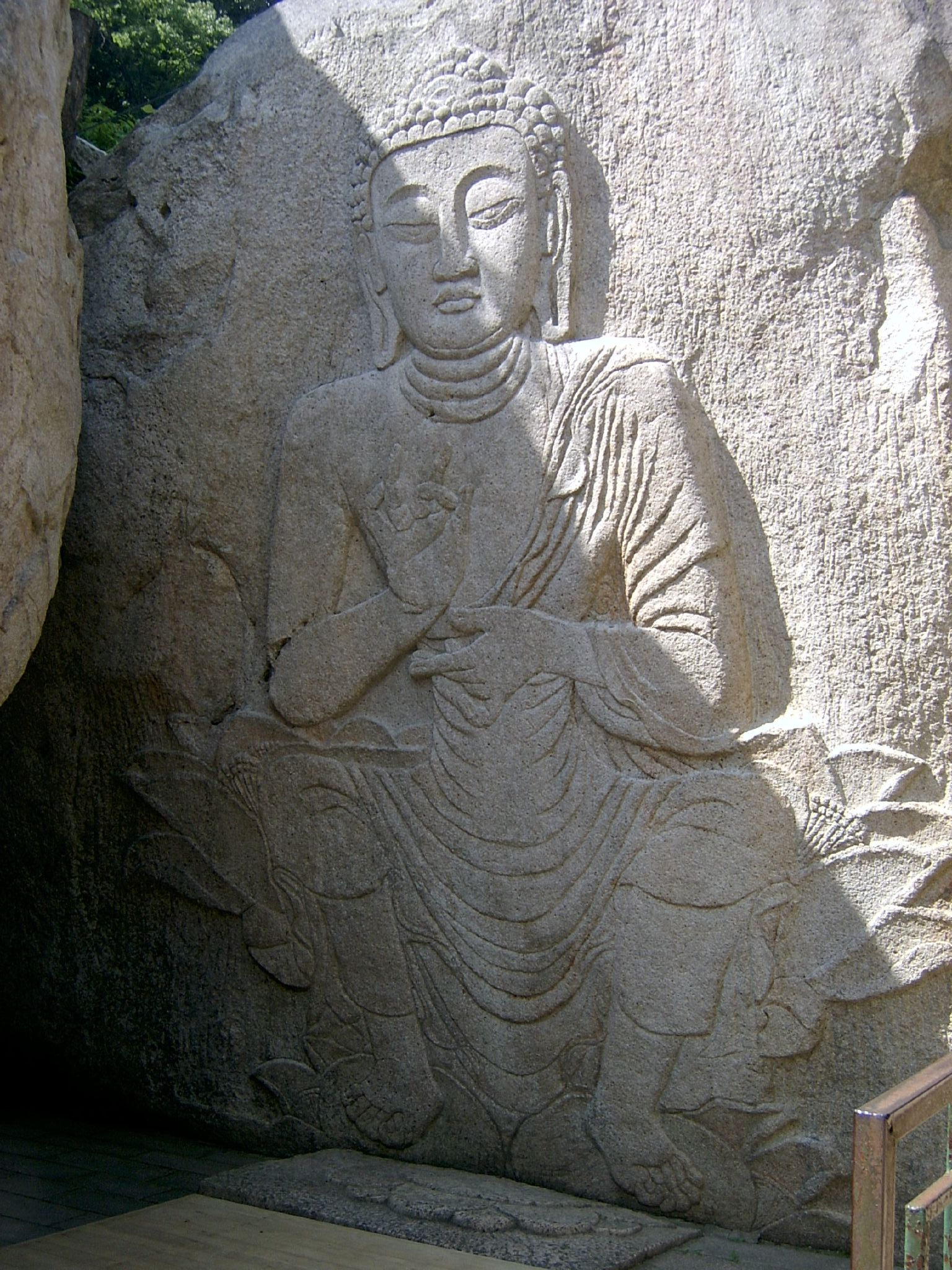
Yeorae Image Seated on Stool and Carved on Rock Surface At Beopjusa, Treasure No. 216, Sanae-ri. Naesongni-myeon, Boeun-gun Chungcheongtuk-do

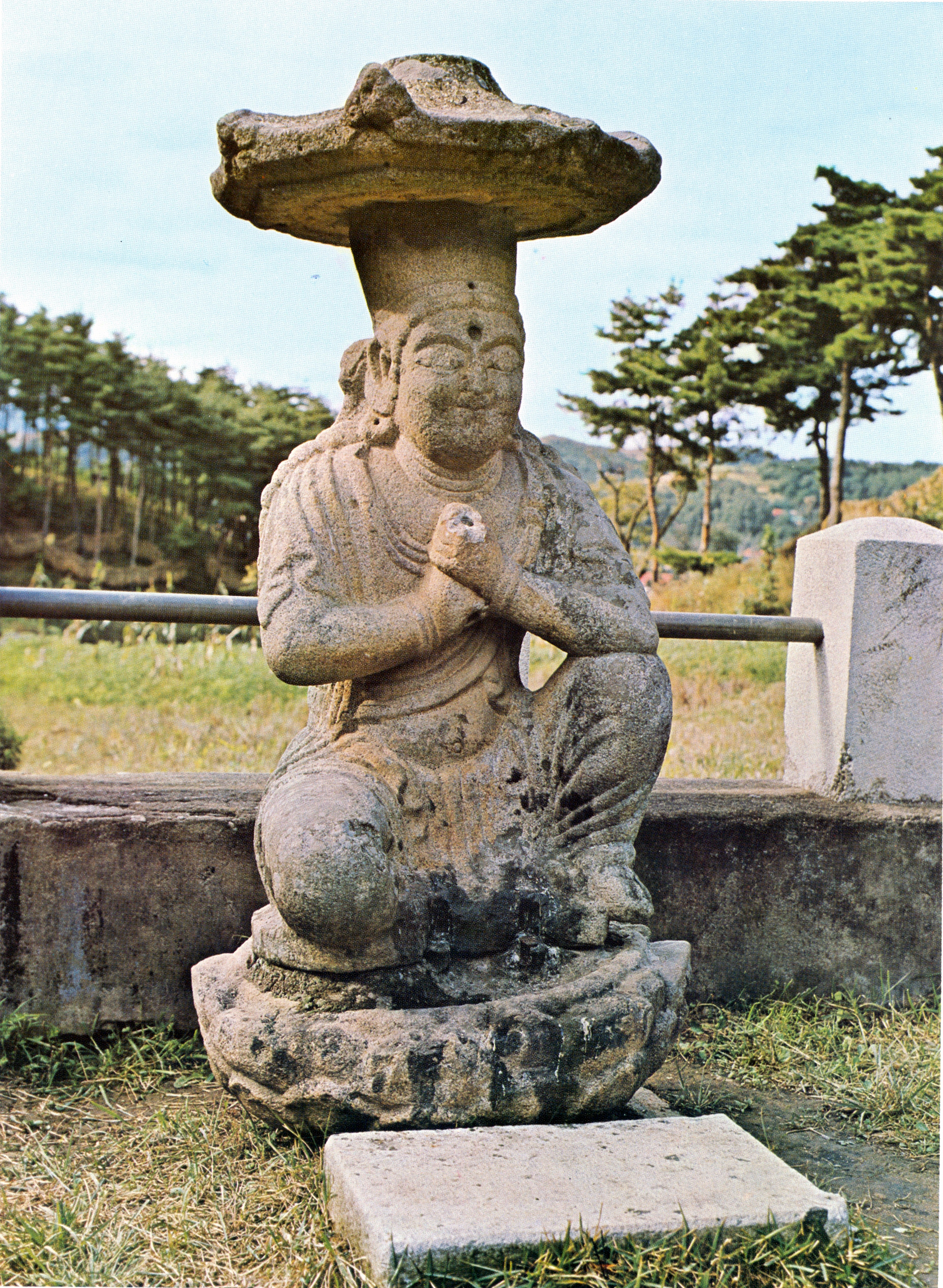
Seated Stone Bodhisattva at Sinboksa temple site in Gangneung, Korea

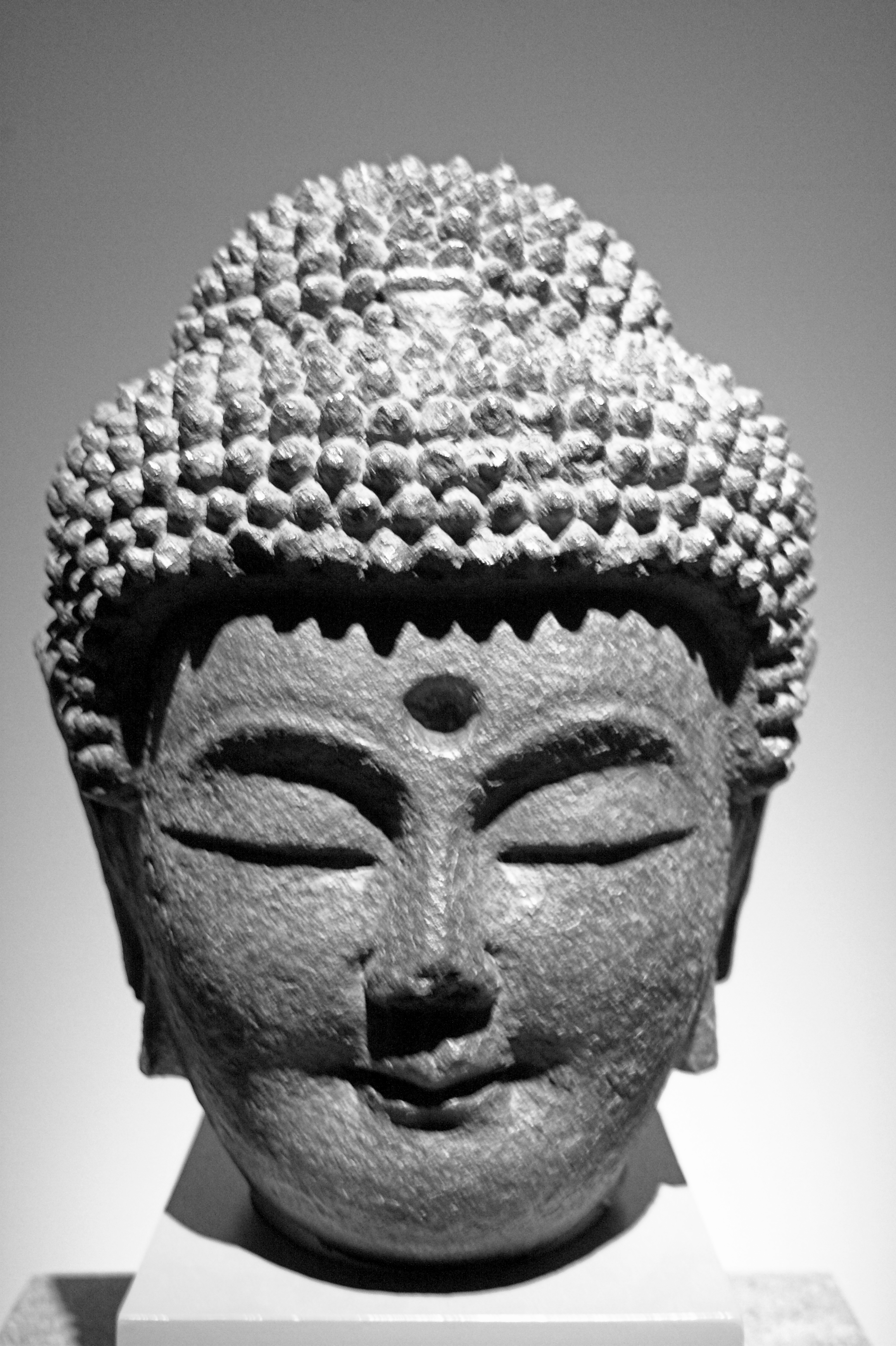
Head of Buddha, 10th–11th century. Cast iron, h. 37.4 cm. National Museum of Korea.

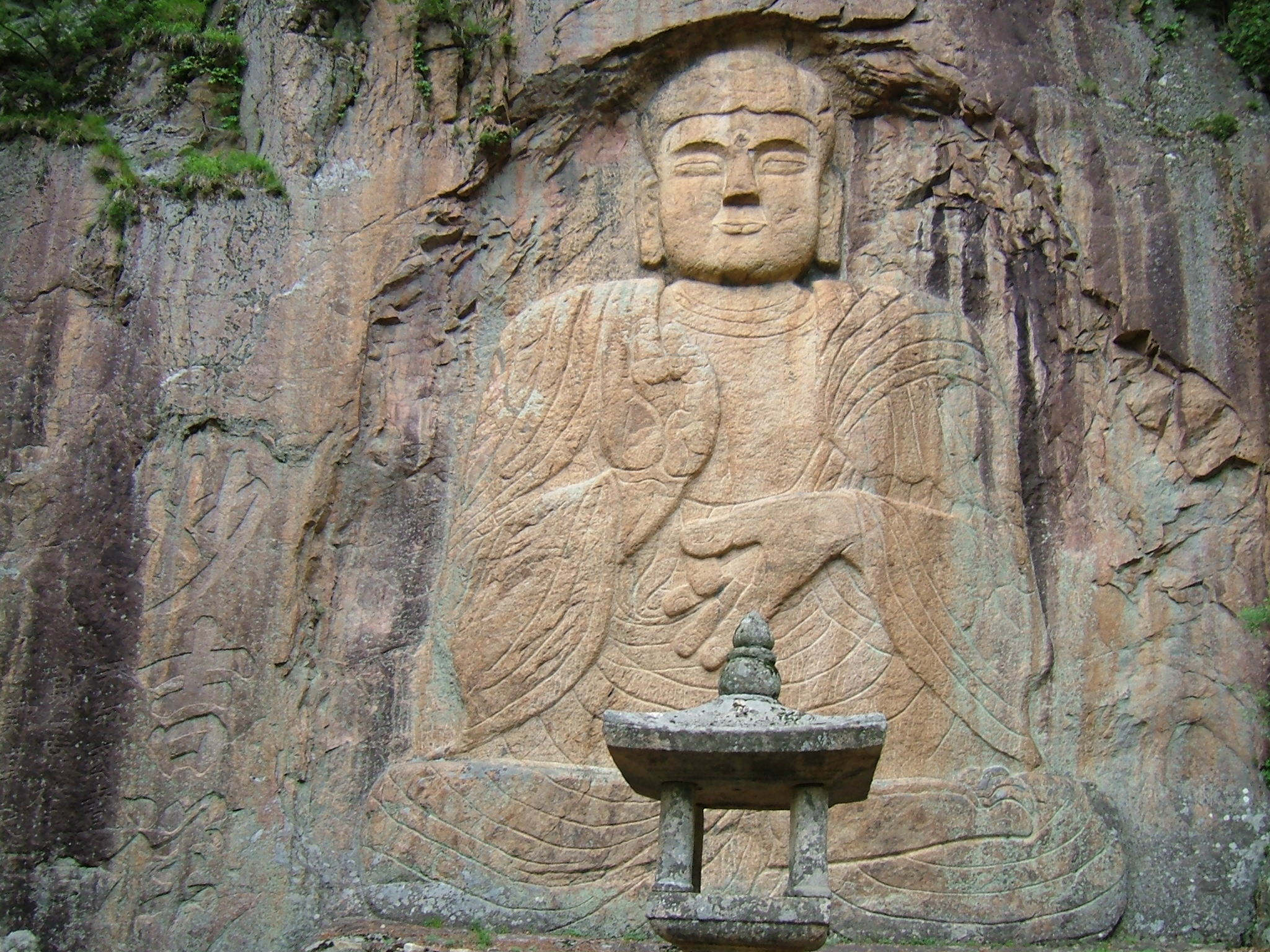
The Myogilsang Buddhist statue on Mount Kumgang, the 102nd National treasure of North Korea.

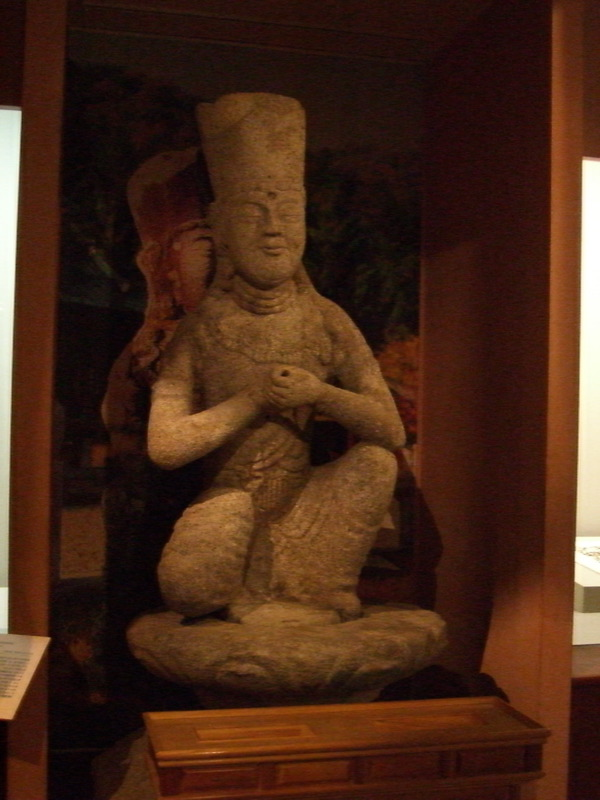
Seated bodhisattva, early Goryeo period. Woljeong-sa.

Middle Goryeo (1170–1270)

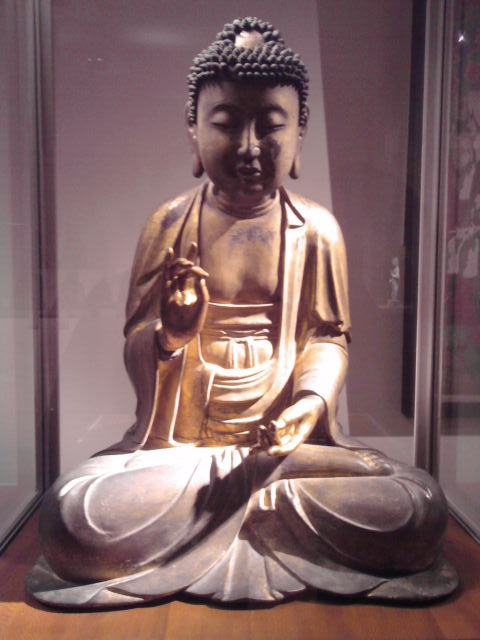
Seated Buddha, 11th-12th century. Gilded wood, h. 62 cm. Musée Guimet.

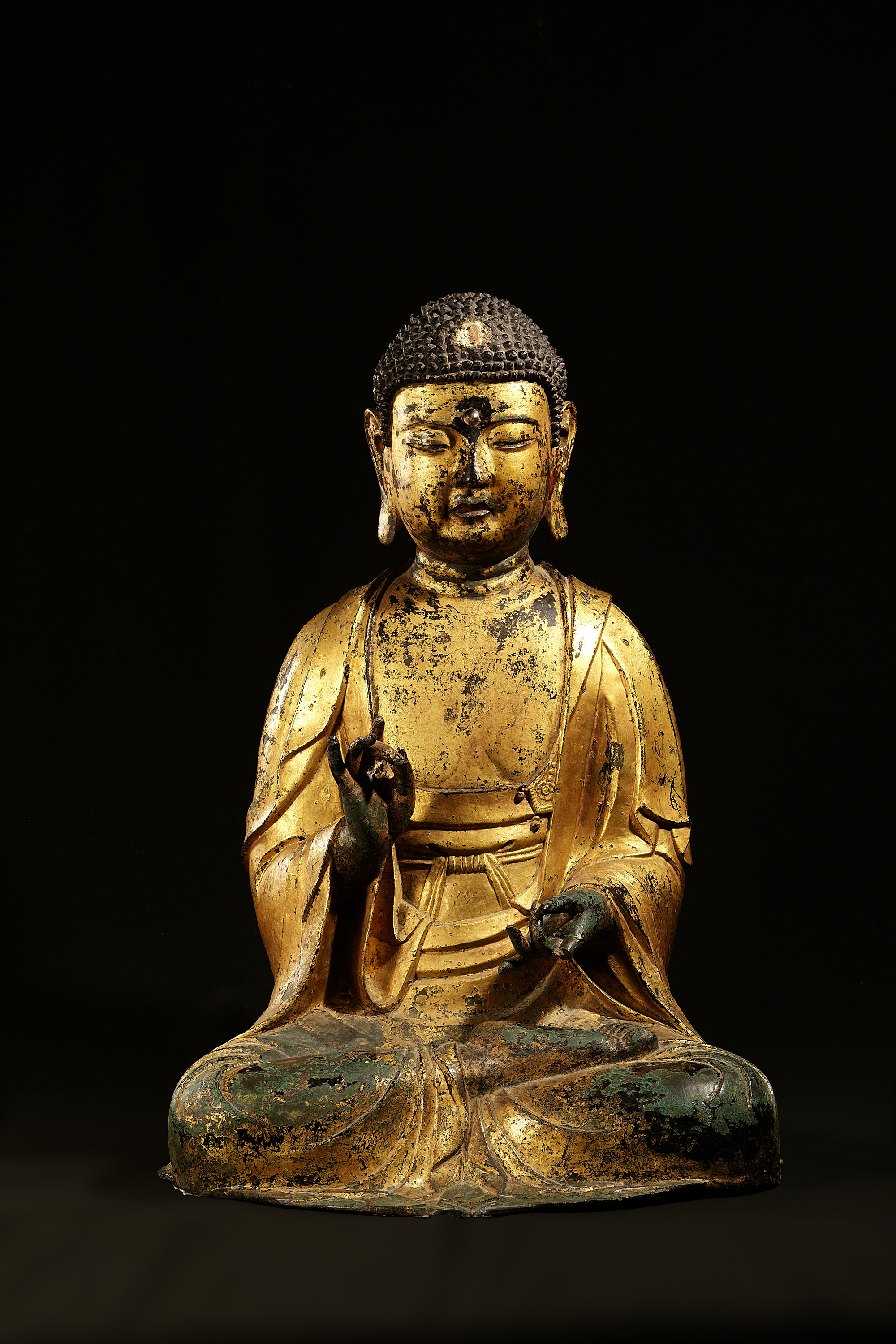
Gilt-bronze Seated Avalokitesvara Bodhisattva, Goryeo dynasty

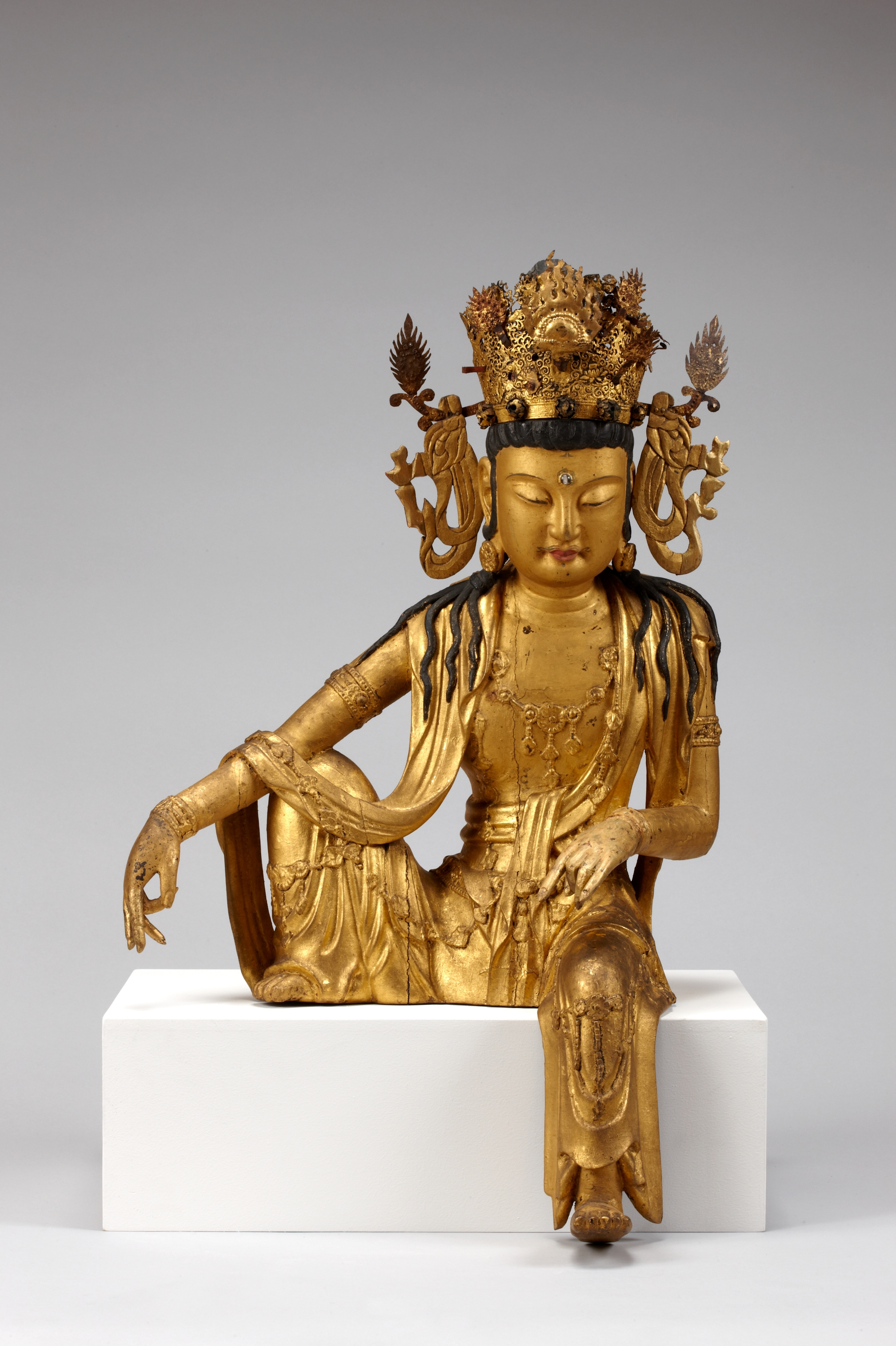
Avalokiteshvara. Goryeo period, 13th century, National Museum of Korea.

Late Goryeo (1270–1392)

Seated Gilt-bronze Bhaisajyaguru of Janggoksa temple in Cheongyang, 1346. Goryeo Korea

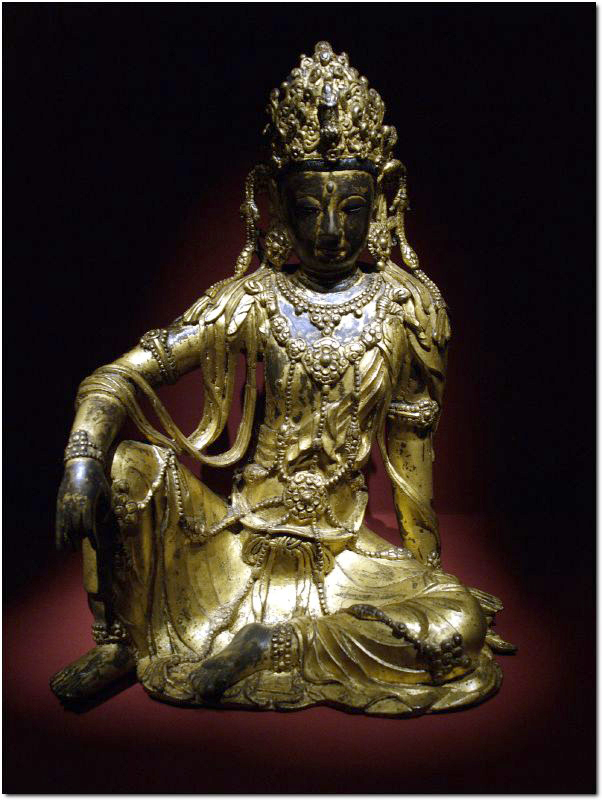
Seated Avalokiteshvara, 14th century. Gilt bronze, h. 38.5 cm. National Museum of Korea.

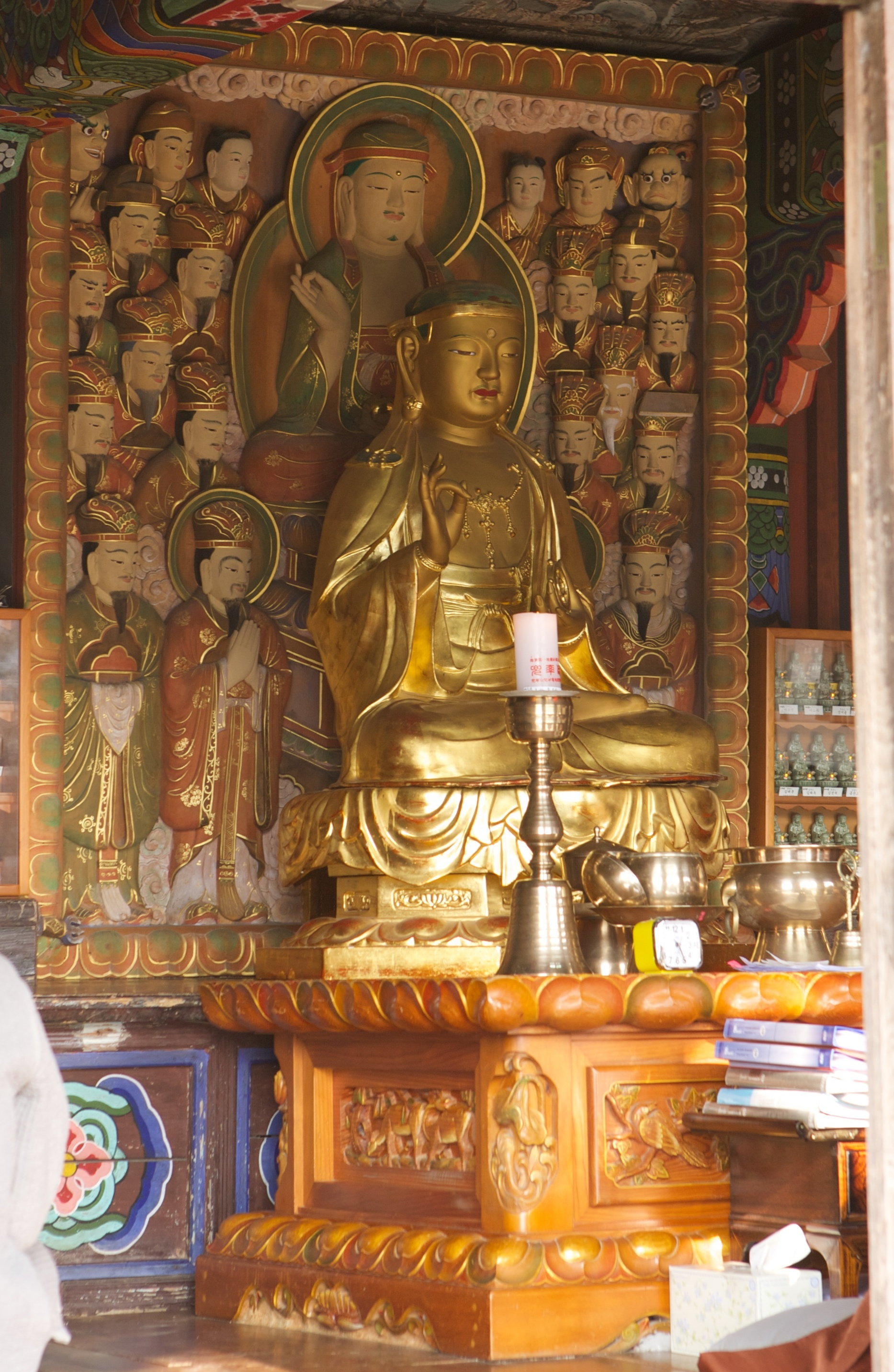
Seated Gilt-bronze Ksitigarbha Bodhisattva at Dosolam Hermitage, Seonunsa Temple in Gochang, Korea

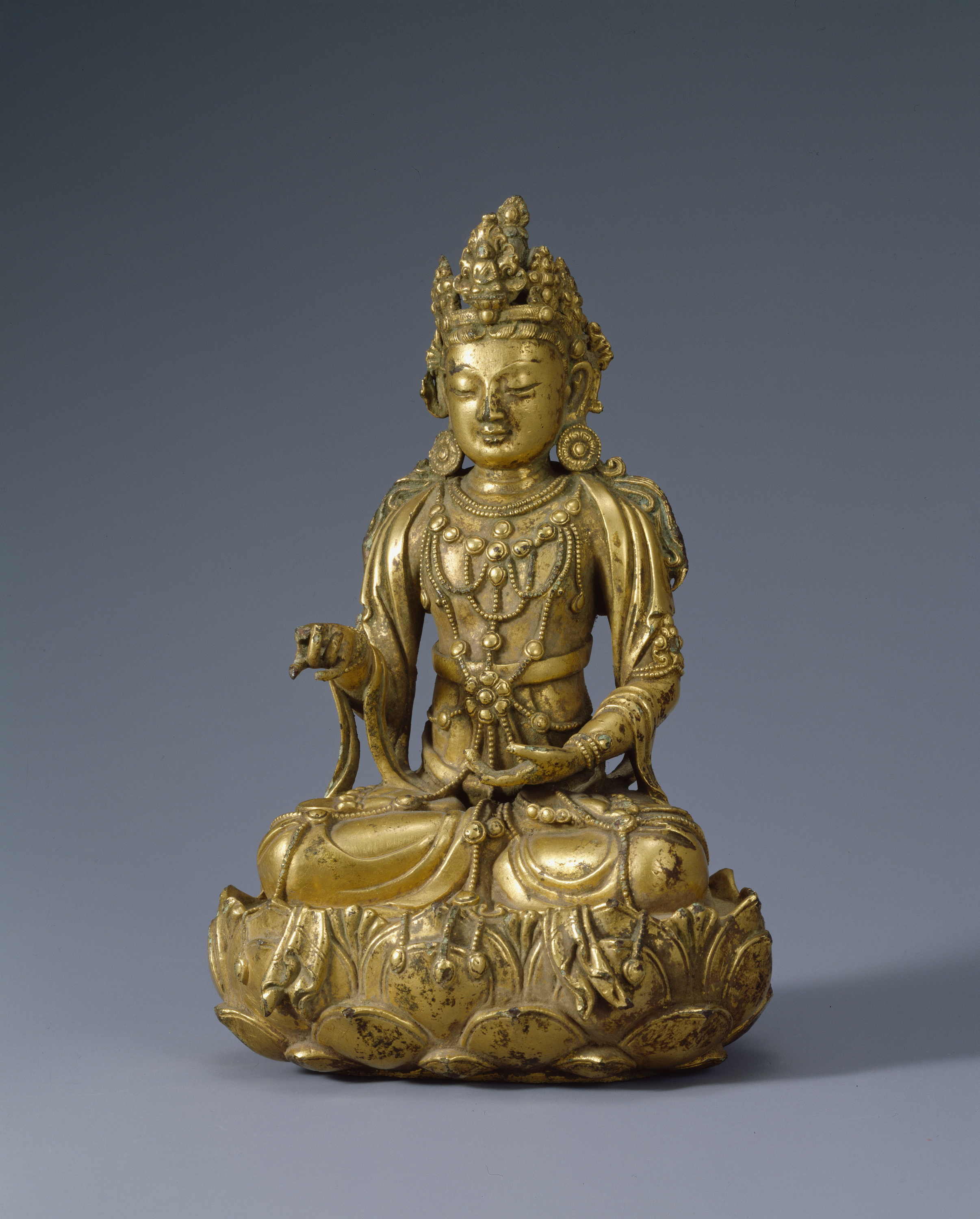
Culture/period: 13th-14th century, Goryeo dynasty. Provenance: Jangyeon-rI, Jangyang-myeon, Hoeyang-gun, Gangwon-do. Materials: Gilt-bronze. Dimensions: h. 15.5 cm

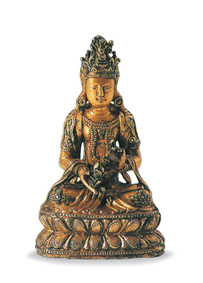
Gilt-bronze Seated Avalokitesvara Bodhisattva. 14th century, Goryeo dynasty.

== Joseon dynasty (1392–1910) ==
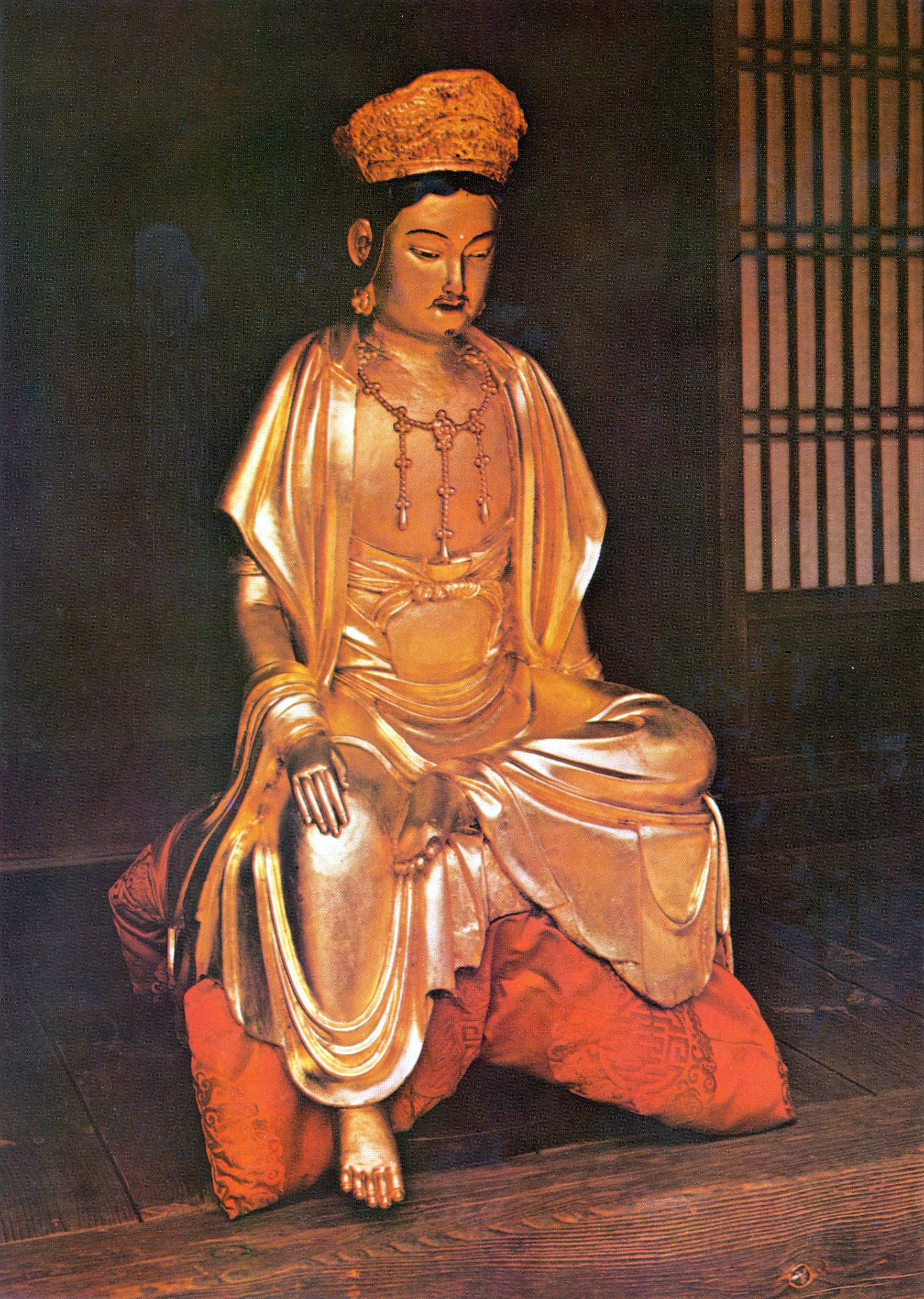
Seated Lacquered Bodhisattva in Half Lotus Position. 1501, Girimsa temple Gyeongju, Korea.

The dynastic change from the Goryeo to the Joseon was a relatively peaceful one. However, for the first time since Buddhism was accepted by the courts of the Three Kingdoms, the religion fell out of favor with the king and his court. The decadent royal patronage by the Goryeo kings and the growing power of the temples and clergy led the Joseon kings to suppress the religion in favor of Neo-Confucianism. While some kings were Buddhists in their private life, the government funds for temples and the commissioning and quality of statues declined.

Like most Korean works of art, early Joseon sculpture fared poorly in the Japanese invasions of Korea from 1592 to 1598 and few survive today. The Japanese invasion is the dividing line between early Joseon and late Joseon. The bravery of the monks who fought against the Japanese invaders was recognized after the war. While never the official religion of the court, Buddhism enjoyed a resurgence and many of the temples and statues that are seen in Korea today were built from the 17th century onward.

Joseon dynasty (1392–1910)

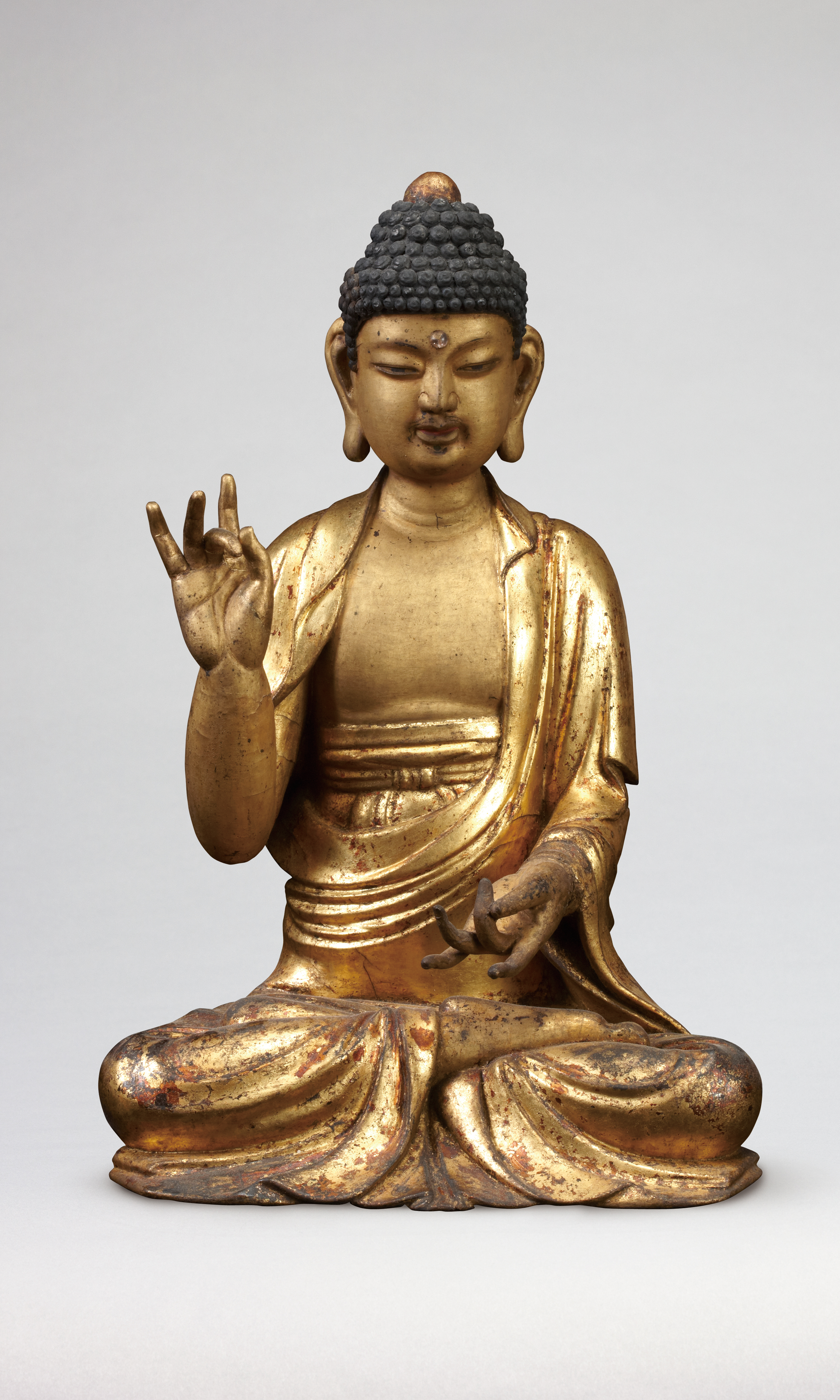
Wooden Seated Amitābha. 15th century, Joseon dynasty. h. 57.3 cm. National Museum of Korea.

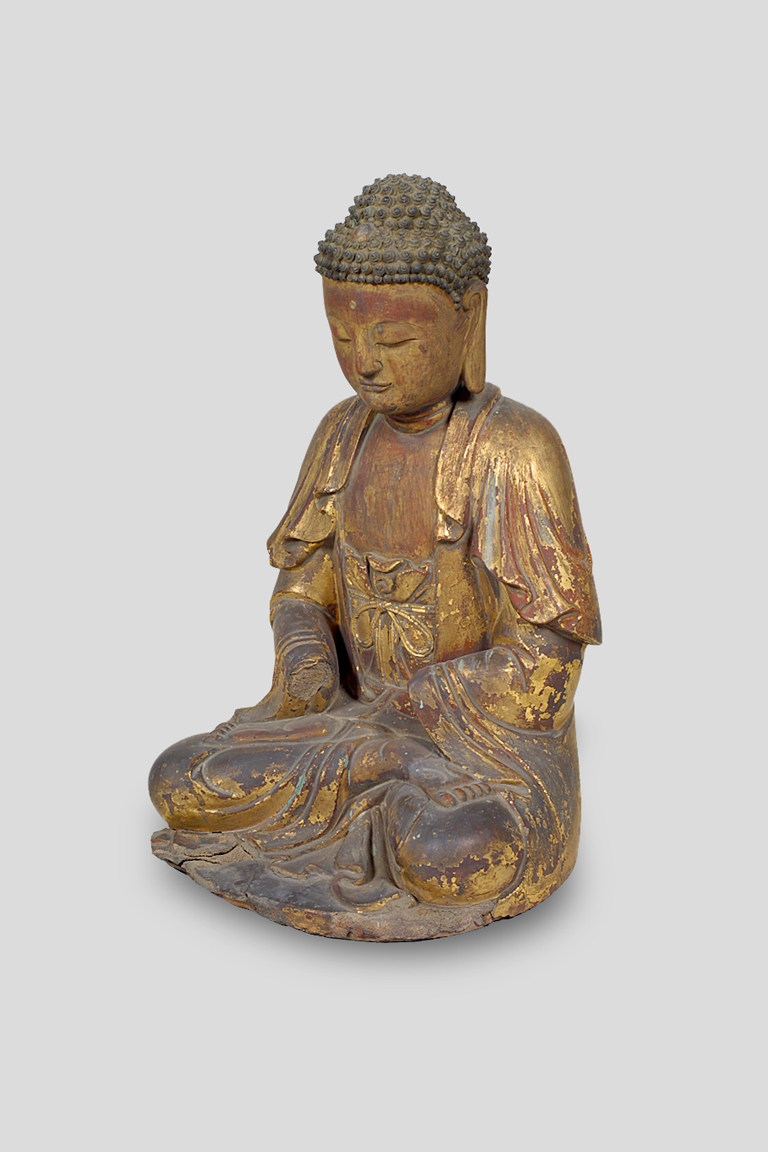
Seated Lacquered Buddha. 15th century, Joseon period.

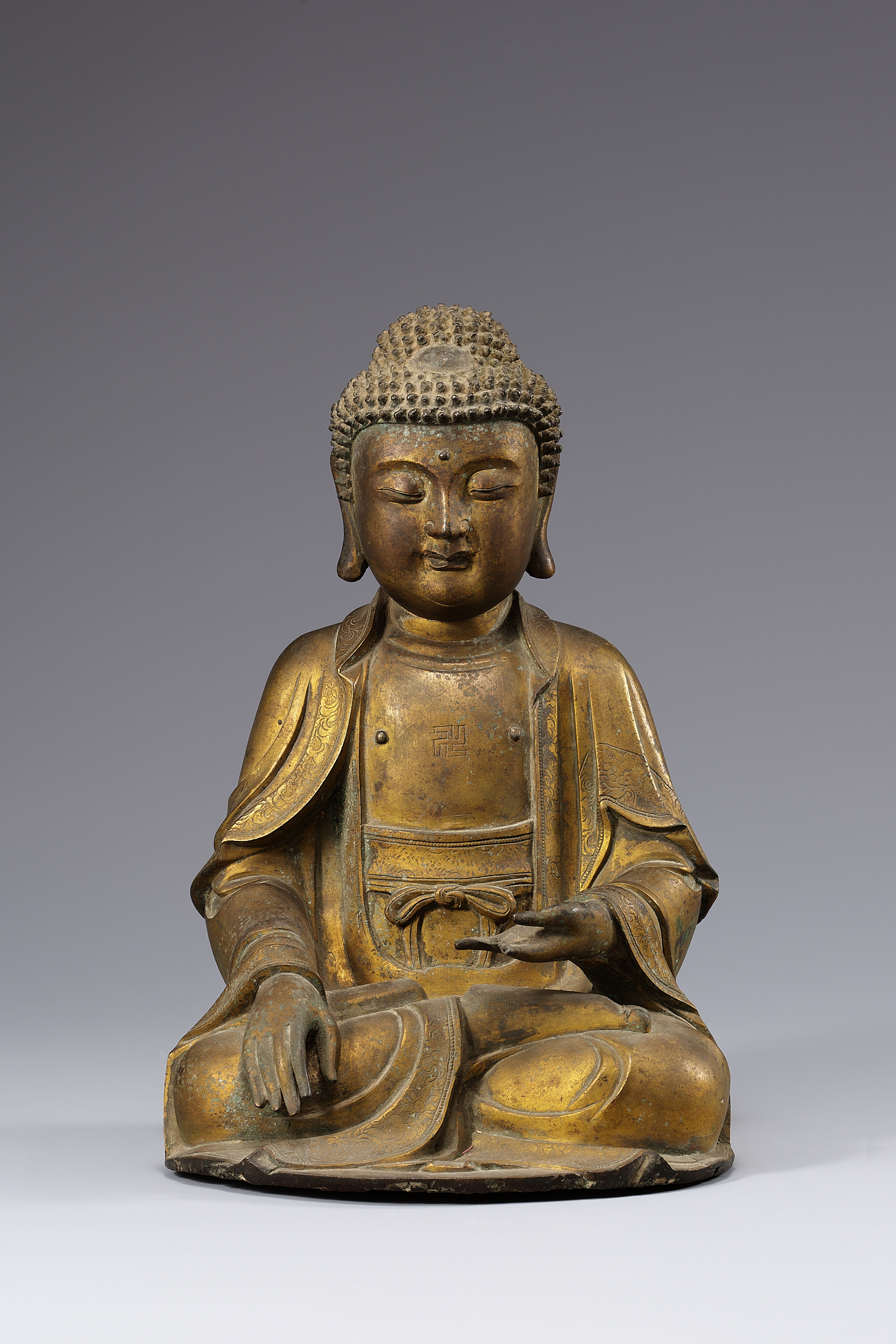
Gilt-bronze Seated Amitabha Buddha. Joseon dynasty. h. 27.9 cm. National Museum of Korea.

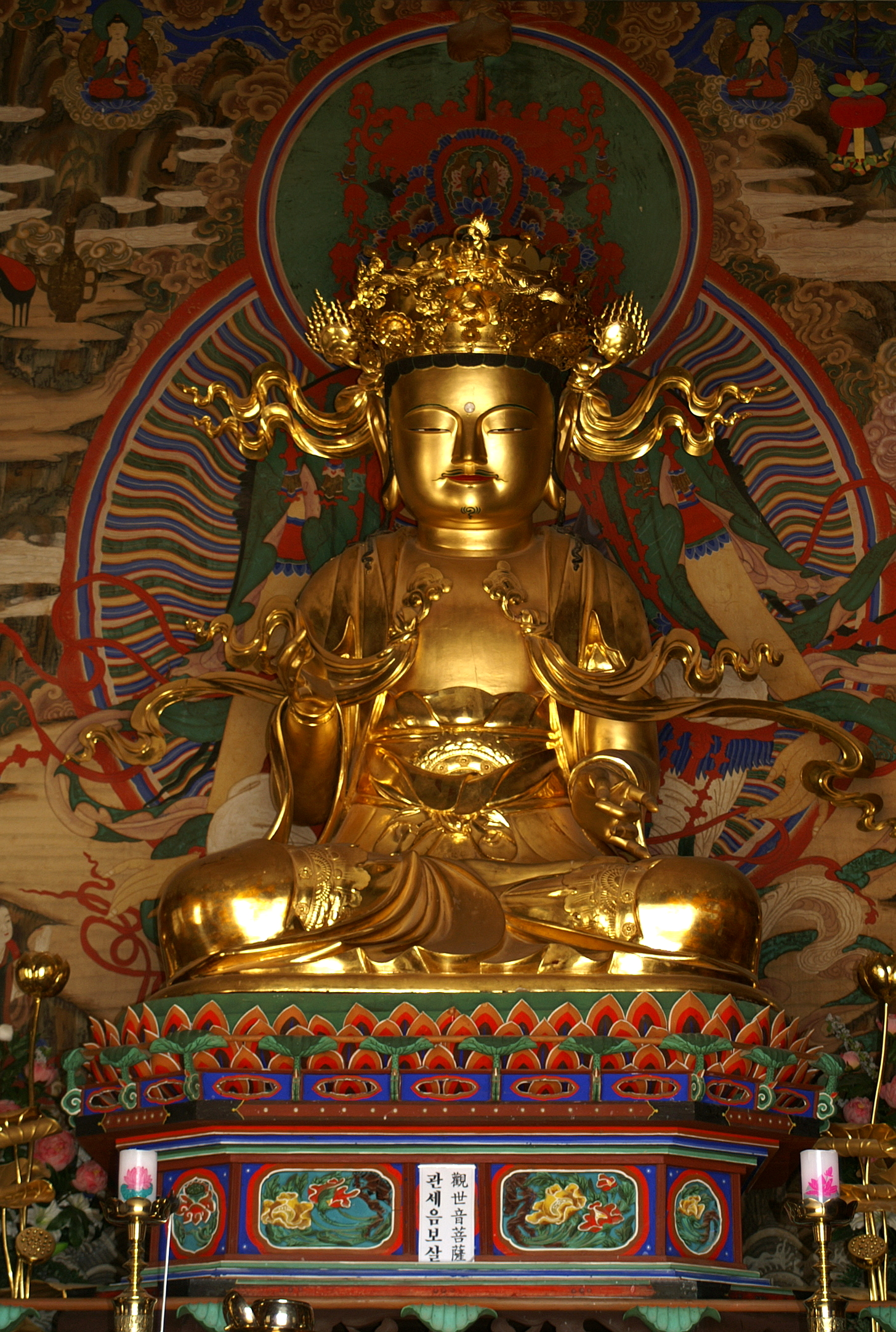
Seated Avalokitesvara (Kr. Kwanŭm or Kwanseŭm), by Hyehui. Gilt-bronze, Joseon period, 1655. Beopjusa (McR. Pŏpchu-sa), Boeun, Chungcheongbuk-do, South Korea.

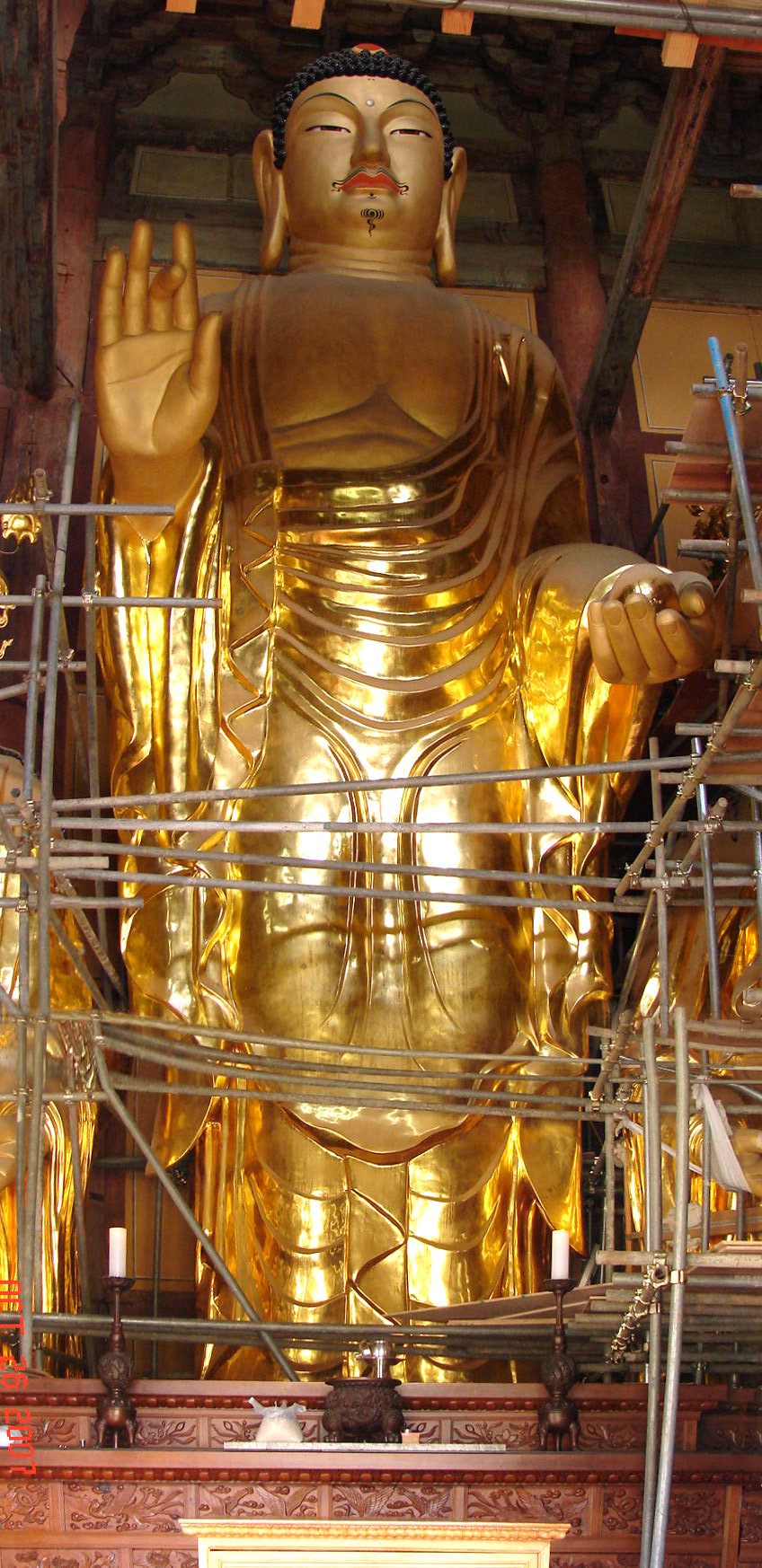
Geumsansa

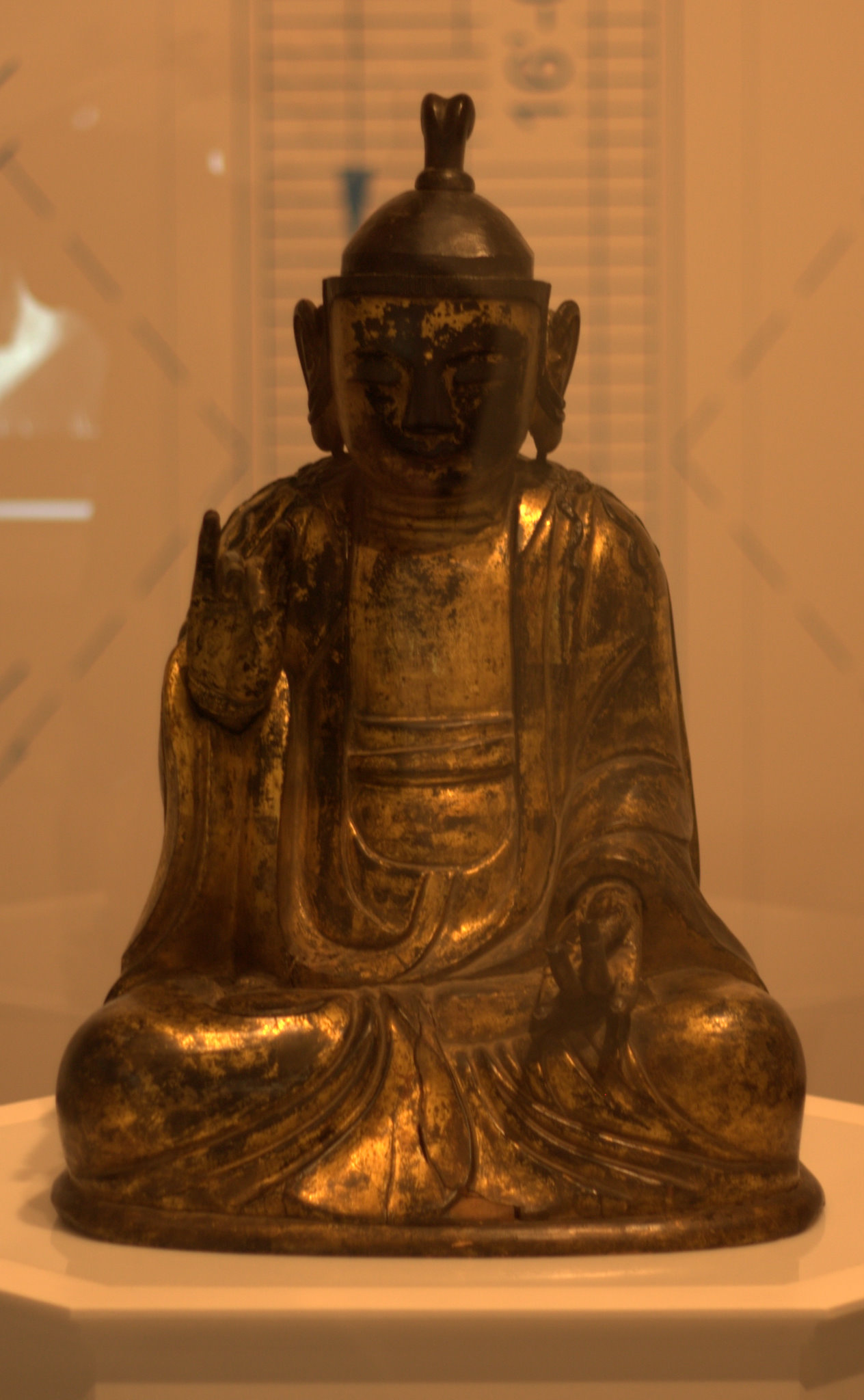
Seated bodhisattva, 17th century. Gilt wood, h.64.8 cm. Harn Museum of Art.

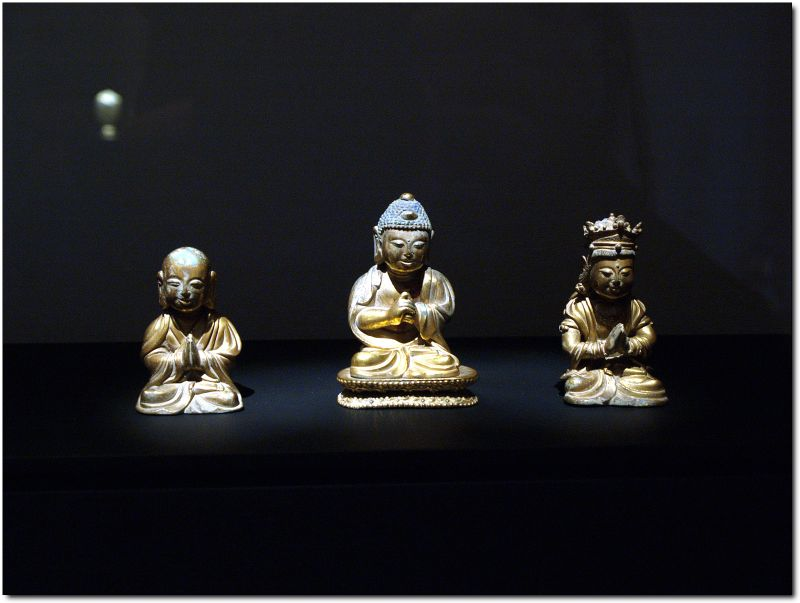
Vairocana Buddha (middle figure), 1628. Gilt bronze, h. 12.6 cm. Monk (left), 1628. Giltbronze, h. 9.7 cm. National Museum of Korea.

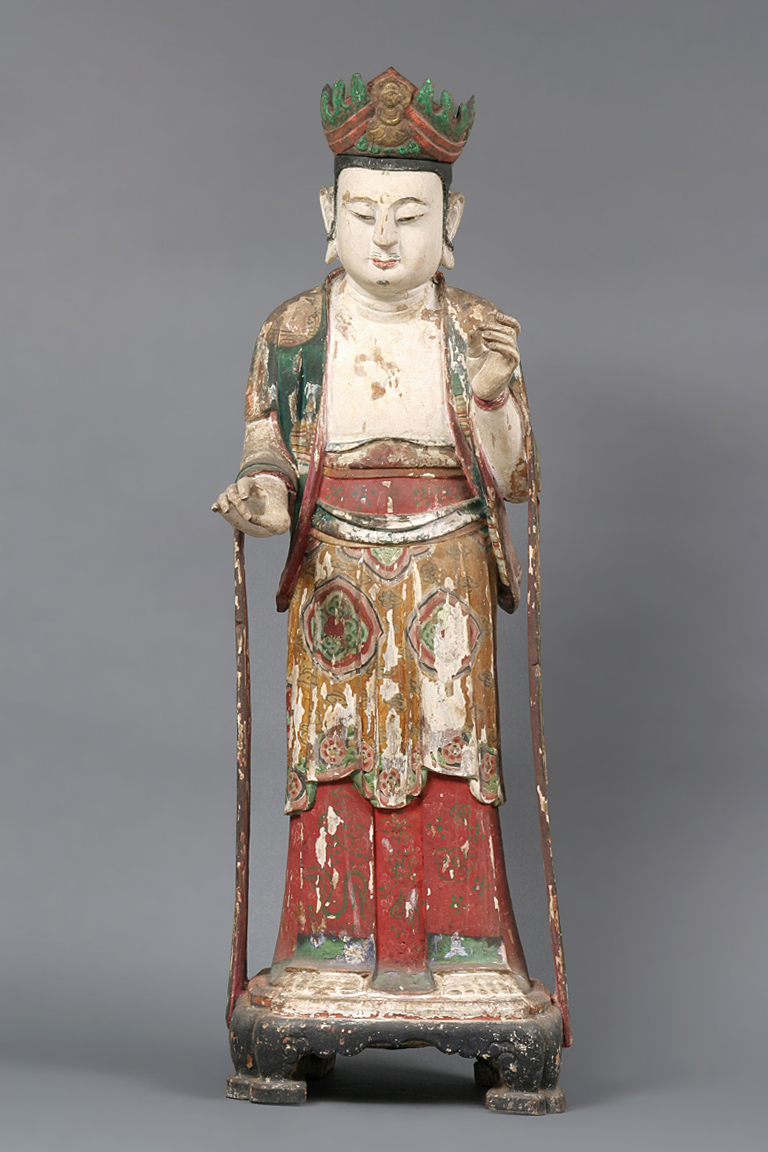
Wooden standing Avalokitesvara Bodhisattva. late Joseon period. Dongguk University Museum.

== Modern ==
Modern

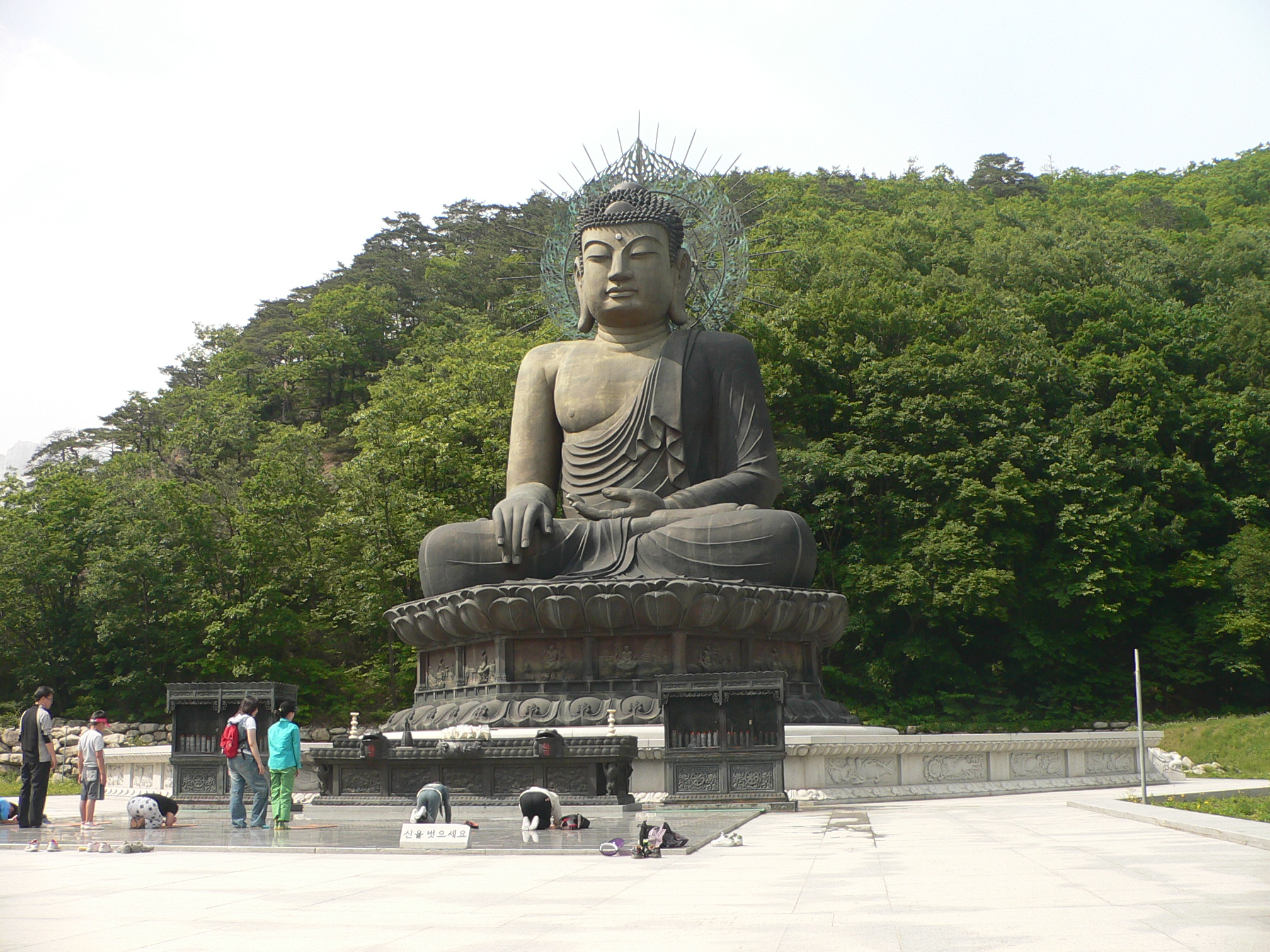
Seated Buddha, 20th century. Bronze. Seoraksan.

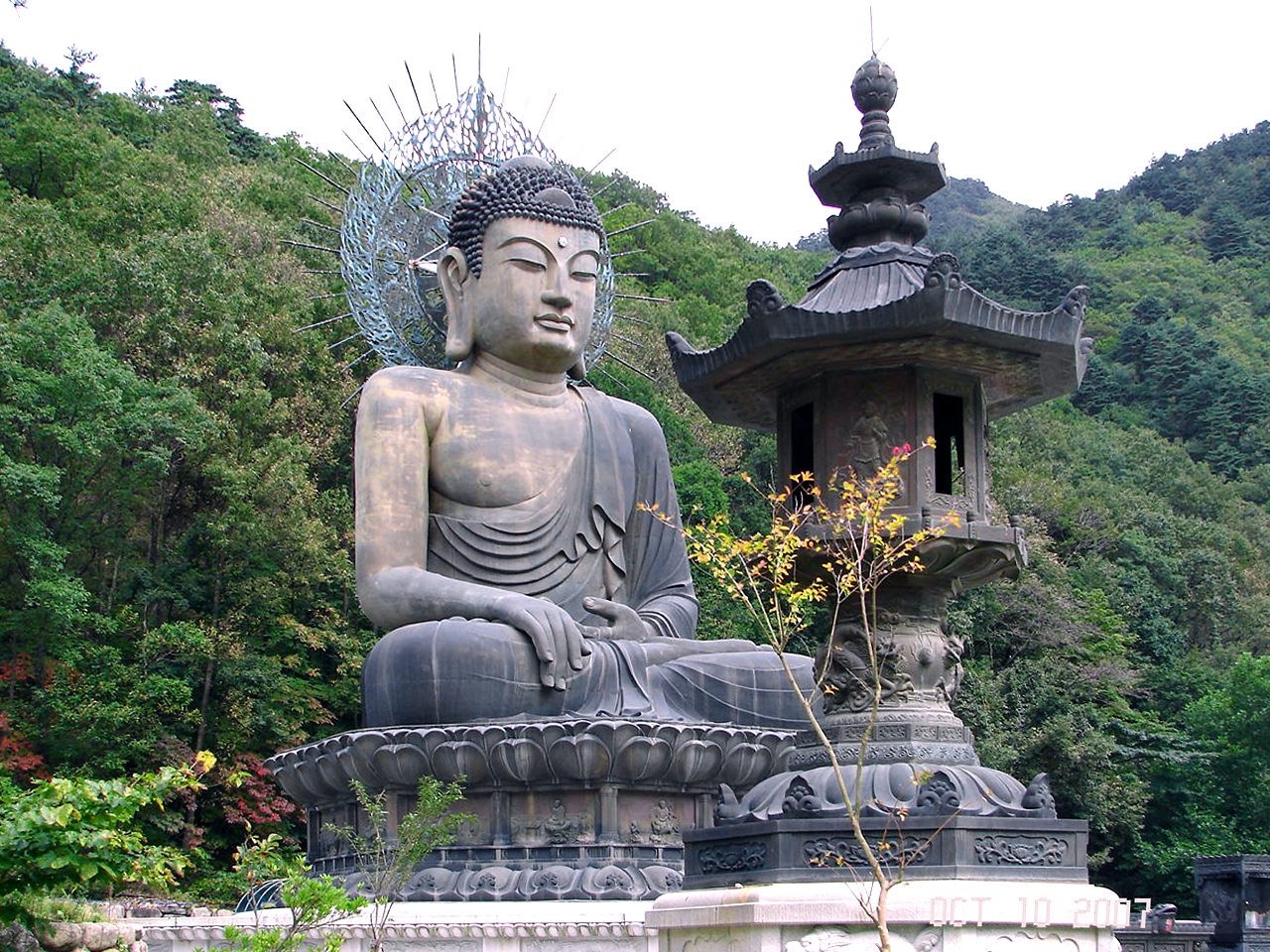

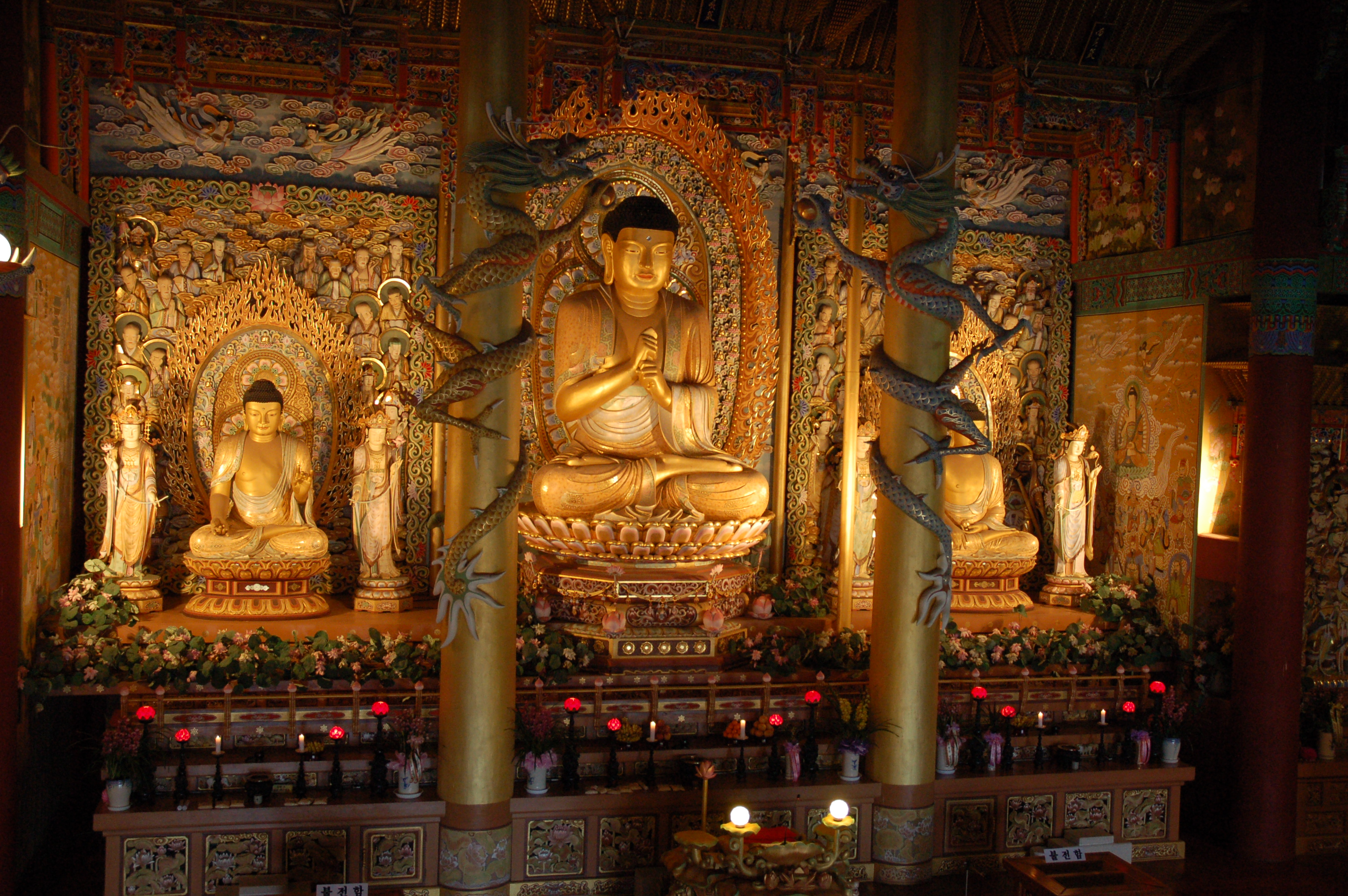
Yakcheonsa, Jeju Province.

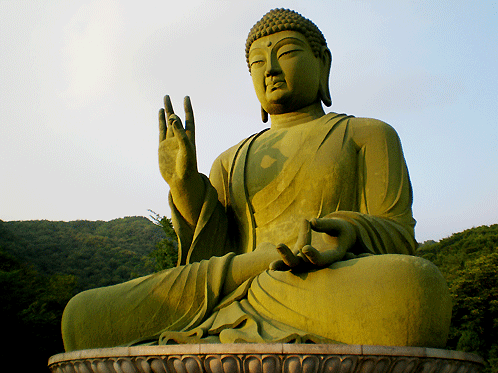

== See also ==
- Gilt-bronze Buddha with Inscription: "Seventh Year of Yeonga"
- Buddhism in Korea
- Buddhist art
- Greco-Buddhist art
- Iconography of Gautama Buddha in Laos and Thailand
- Chinese Buddhist sculpture
- Lao Buddhist sculpture
- Thai Buddhist sculpture
