= Taihe Shakyamuni =

Northern Wei Gilded Statue of the Buddha - National Palace Museum

Taihe Shakyamuni (Gilt bronze Sakyamuni Buddha)
- 青銅鎏金釋迦牟尼佛坐像
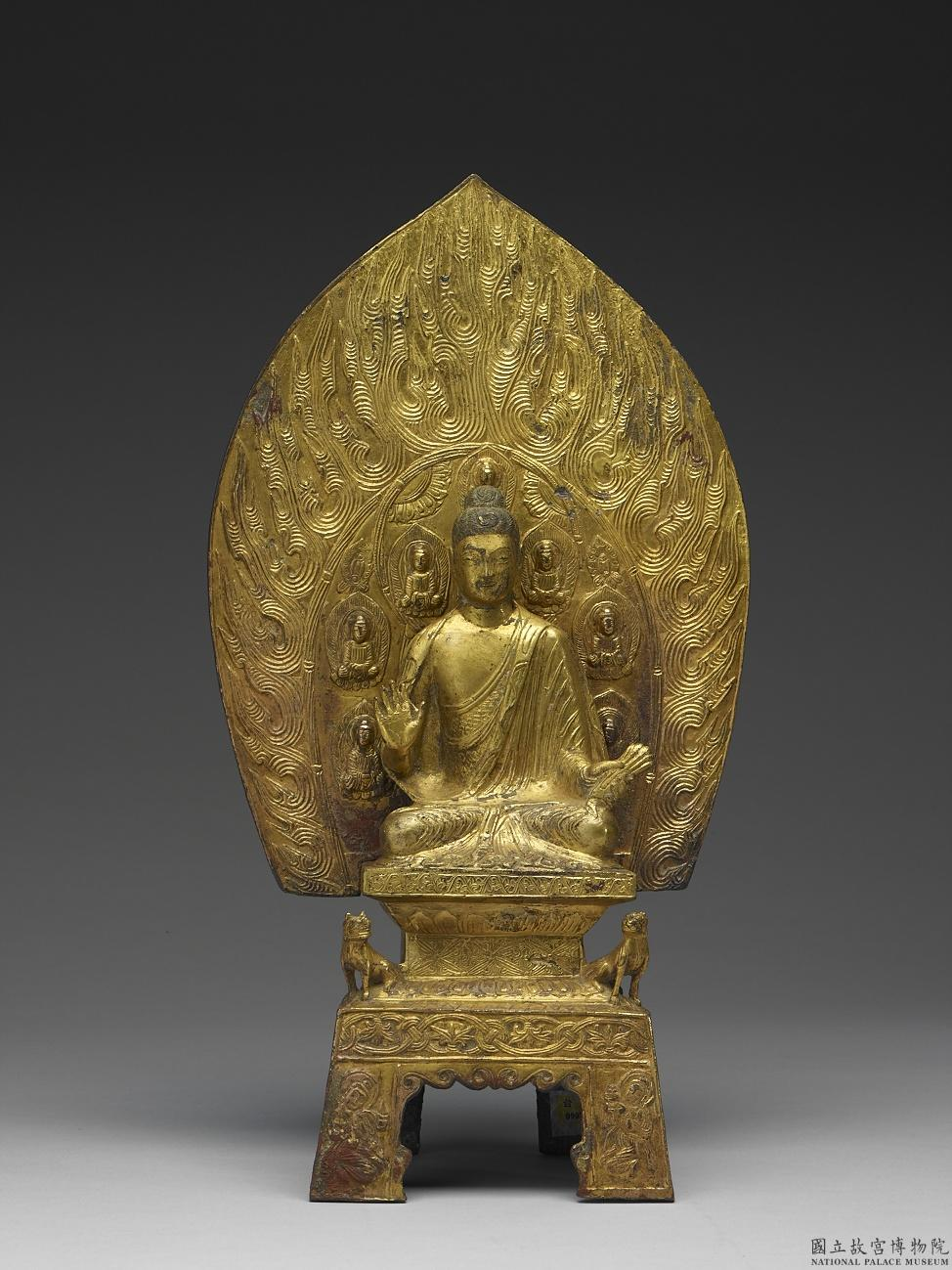
- Type: Buddha statue
- Material: Gilded Bronze
- Height: 40.3 cm
- Width: 14 cm
- Weight: 3.954 kg
- Created: 477
- Period/culture: Northern Wei
- Place: Shilin, Taiwan
- Present location: National Palace Museum
- Registration: 購銅000117

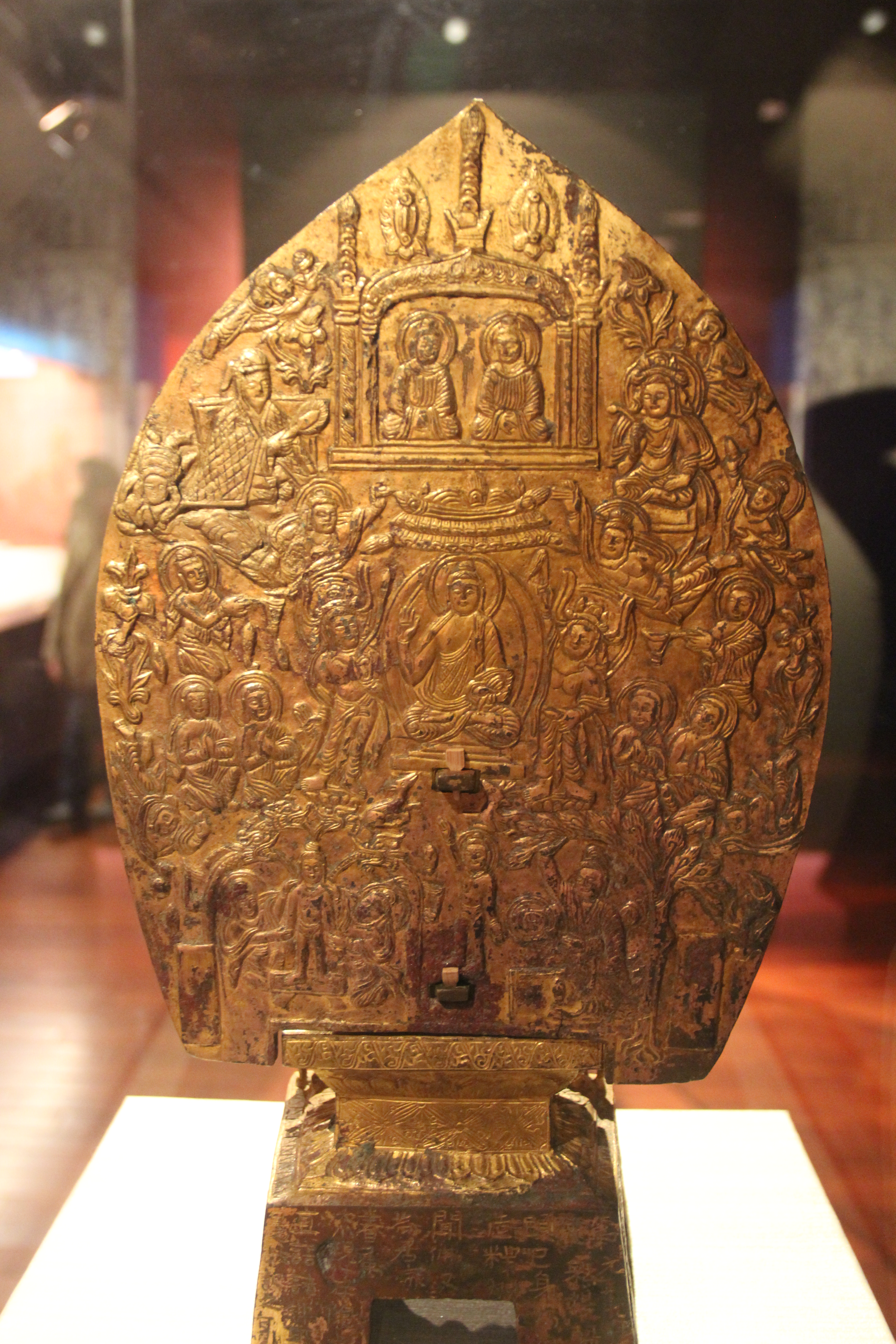
Backside

The Taihe Shakyamuni is a gilded bronze sculpture depicting The Buddha, created in the year 477, during the Northern Wei dynasty, under the reign of Emperor Xiaowen of Northern Wei (471–499). Characteristic of early Buddhist art, with its inscription pinpointing the date of the statue, it is considered a significant piece in the evolution of Chinese Buddhist sculpture. It is currently housed in the National Palace Museum, Shilin, Taiwan.

== Background ==
The Northern Wei Dynasty was dominated by the Xianbei, whose coalition consisted of Tibetans and Turkic people, and thus, the administration consisted of diverse ethnicities in addition to the Han people.

Meanwhile, Buddhism started to proliferate into China during the 5th–6th centuries. The art that manifested had characteristics of Indian Buddhist styles and Gandharan styles.

According to the Book of Wei, during the reign of Emperor Xiaowen, the Taihe (太和) era (Era of Supreme Harmony), from 477–499, marked a change of assimilation and Sinicization of the Northern Wei court, down to the wardrobe of the courts. Xiaowen was recorded to have studied the traditions of the Shang, Zhou, Han, and Jin dynasties along with analyzing the Four Books and Five Classics.

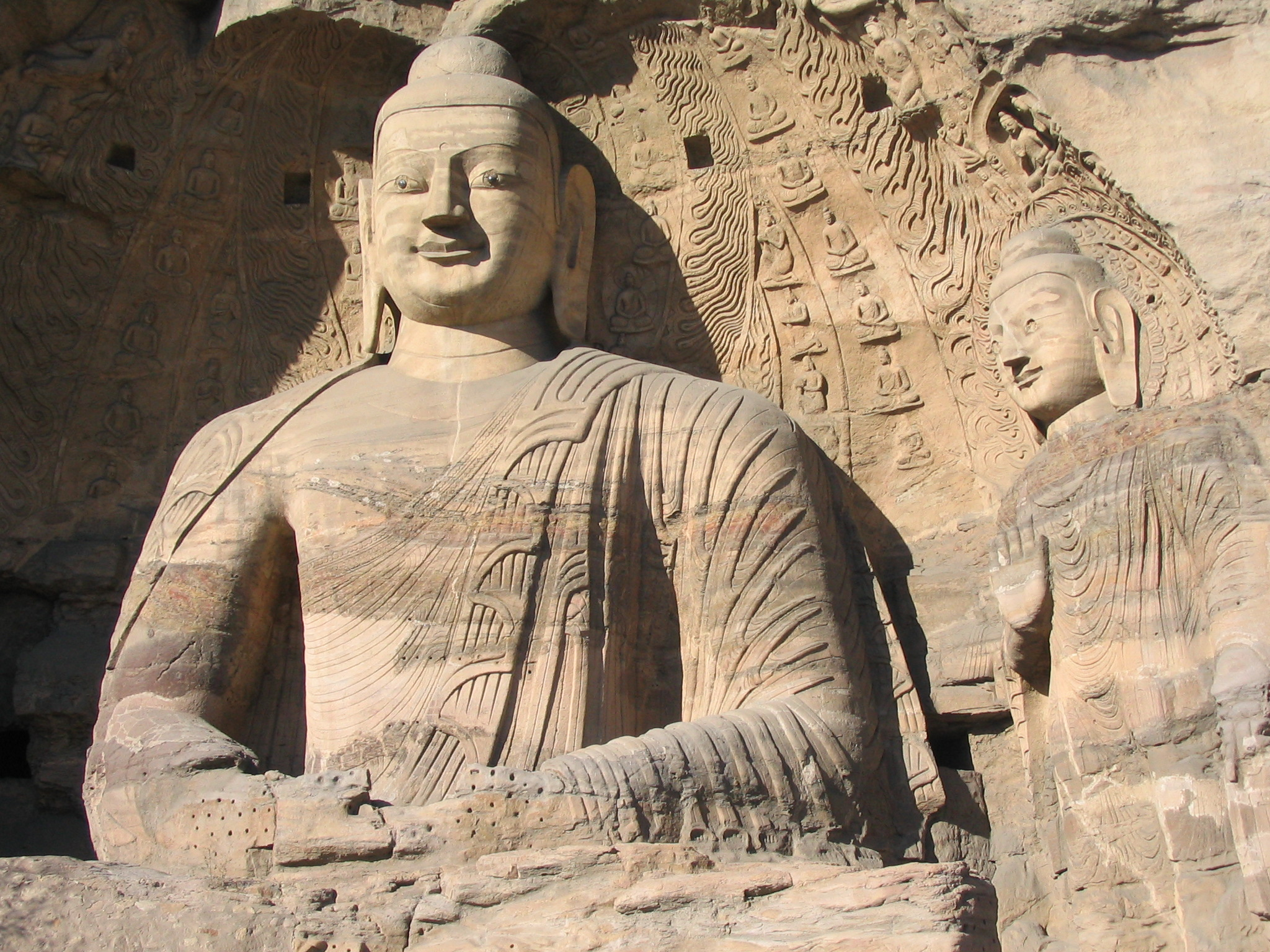
Yungang Grottoes, Cave 20 (Northern Wei), Datong, Shaanxi

As such, Buddhist statues around this era started to take on the forms characteristic of Chinese sculpture. The robes typical of an Indian monk transitioned to thicker pleated, longer garments with straighter folds.

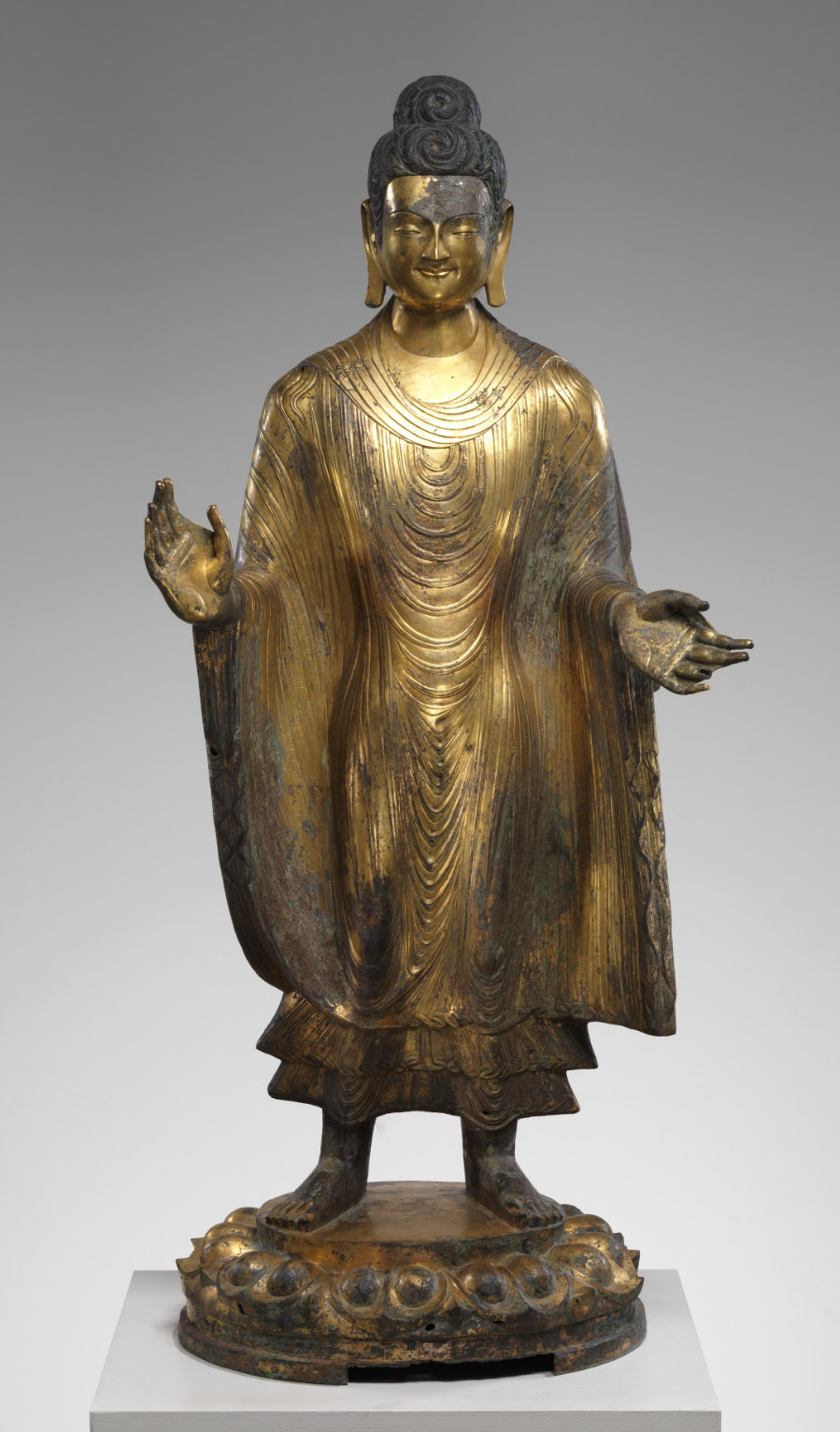
Statue of Maitreya from the Taihe Period (486), Metropolitan Museum of Art (26.123)

The Taihe Shakyamuni, created during the first year of the Taihe era, presents the early transition of Sinicized Buddhist art, its dedication date allowing for the pinpointing of minute comparisons. As such, it is often studied with contemporaneous pieces such as that of the Yungang Grottoes and the Longmen Grottoes.

== The statue ==
Weighing 3954 grams, the statue presents a more mobile size compared to the colossal Buddhas at Yungang and Longmen. The Buddha is seated in the lotus position, his right hand in the abhayamudra, and left hand resting on the robe, which maintains the older kasaya style. It is assembled from two pieces: the figure and stand, and the body and halo

The gilding with a tint of red adheres to the bronze and shows very little sign of wear and peeling.

In the background of the Buddha, the sculpture stands on multiple tiers. The top tier depicts Mount Meru, decorated with lotuses, and floral scrolls. Two lions sit at the base, heads turned back. The lower tier is a square stand, with wave patterns, figures making offerings, and more floral scroll patterns

The reverse of the halo backing depicts the Buddha with Prabhutaratna. Manjusri can be seen with a ruyi, and Vimalakirti, is seen conversing with Manjusri, taken from a scene in the Vimalakirti Sutra.

The lower backing of the halo depicts a scene from Buddha's life, with his mother Queen Maya, as well as the adult Buddha emerging from her right side. In addition, Dragon Kings bathe the Buddha as Brahma and Indra accompany in mediation.

The inscription on the side of the statue dates the commemoration of it, to the 10th day of the 9th lunar month, of the 1st year of Taihe.

== Provenance ==
The National Palace Museum acquired the statue from Peng Kai-dong (1912–2006) of Hsinchu.

A resident of Japan, he specialized in jewelry, restaurants, galleries and property management, at one point being the 13th richest in Japan. In the immediate post-WWII period, the antique market expanded, and as such his holdings expanded, with an awakening of Buddhist faith after a brief stint in jail.

Peng lent the statues to the National Palace Museum in 1987. The Taihe Shakyamuni was officially acquired by the museum in 1995. While housed in Japan, the Taihe Shakyamuni, along with a figure of Guanyin from the Five Dynasties and Ten Kingdoms period, had a value of NT$1 billion, and as such was considered a significant cultural relic in Japan. It took coordination between the National Palace Museum and the Taipei Economic and Cultural Representative Office in Japan to transfer the ownership.
