= Chinese Buddhist sculpture =

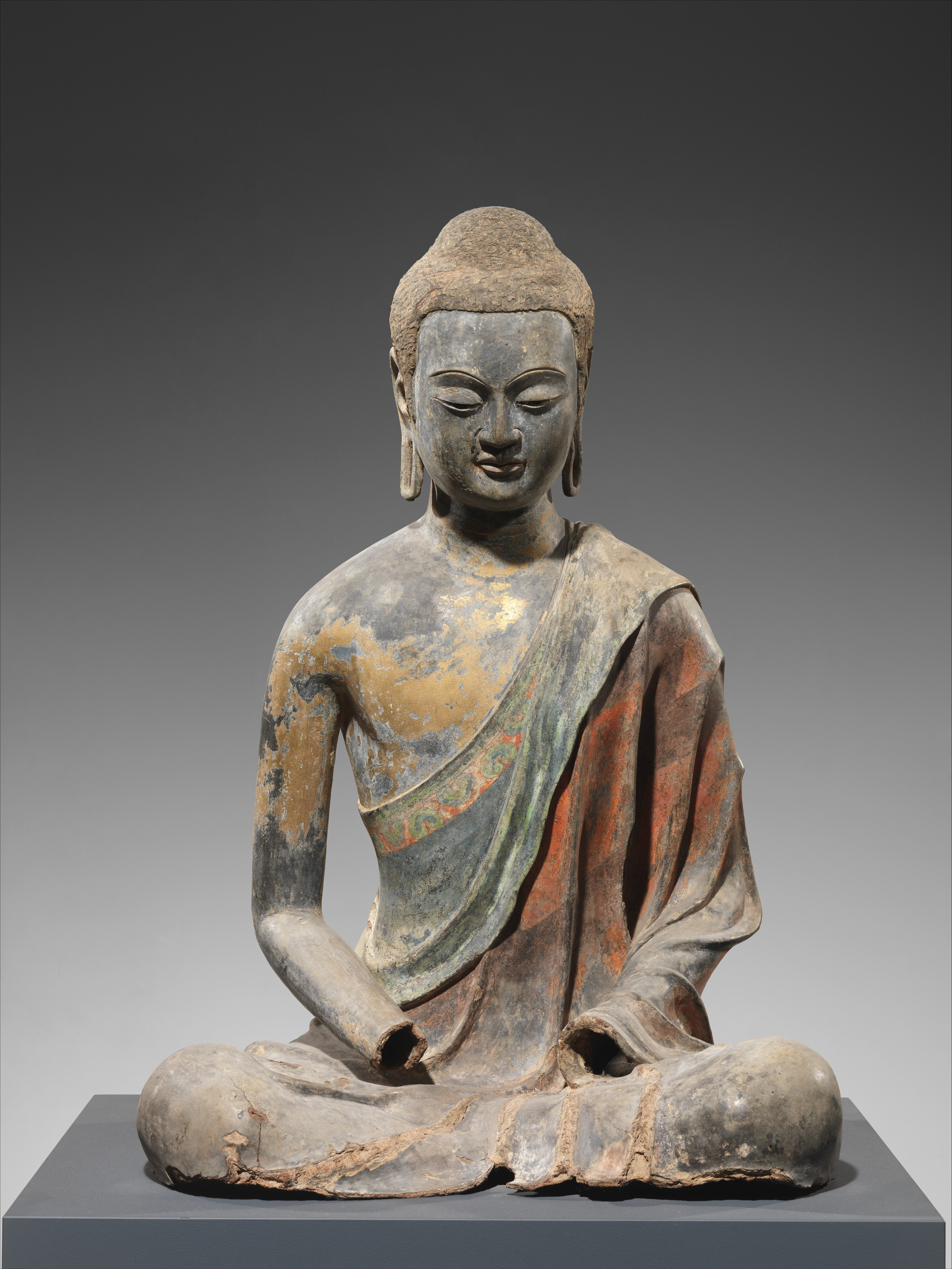
Buddha, probably Amitabha (Ēmítuófó), 7th century, Tang dynasty, The Metropolitan Museum of Art

Chinese Buddhist sculpture has been produced throughout the history of Buddhism in China. Sculptural pieces include representations of Siddhārtha Gautama, often known as the "Enlightened One" or "Buddha", Bodhisattvas, monks and various deities. China was introduced to the teachings of Buddhism as early as the 2nd century BCE, during China's Han dynasty, becoming more established during the 2nd century CE. The earliest representations did not start as sculptures of the human form, but rather an empty seat, footprint, tree or stupa, an architectural form eventually inspiring the creation of pagodas in China.

The practice started in rock-cut cave temples where carvings, mostly in relief, of images enveloped chambers and complexes illustrating the beliefs associated to the Buddha's teachings. Creating these temples and sculptures not only garnered merit aligned to their own personal growth, but gave devotees a reference for worship and meditative inspiration. Major rock-cut sites, with large groups of excavated caves, include the Yungang Grottoes, Longmen Grottoes, Maijishan Grottoes, and Mogao Caves.

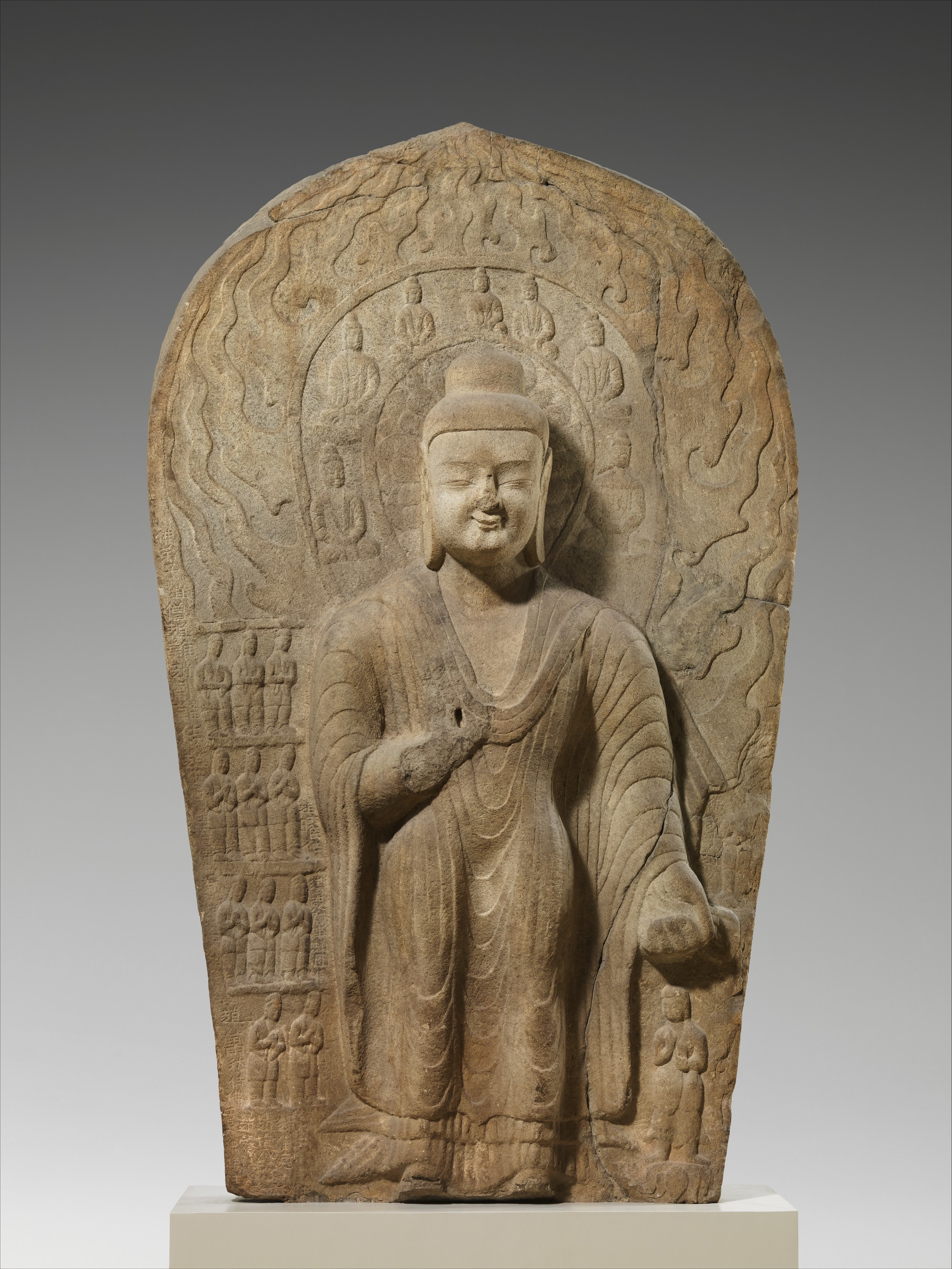
Buddha Dipankara (Rándēng Fó), The Metropolitan Museum of Art

Sculptures in the round, first began in India and eventually came to production in China during the 4th century CE. While inspired by Indian renderings, various sittings positions, facial expressions and clothing types culminated a visual mix. Sculptures with slim bodies and thicker garments embodied Chinese traditions as opposed to Indian variations depicting larger physiques & sheer clothing. Media for these sculptures also ranged from sandstone, limestone, wood, ceramic, gilt bronze to copper alloy. Despite the monotone appearances of remaining sculptures today, these works were once brightly painted with an array of pigments.

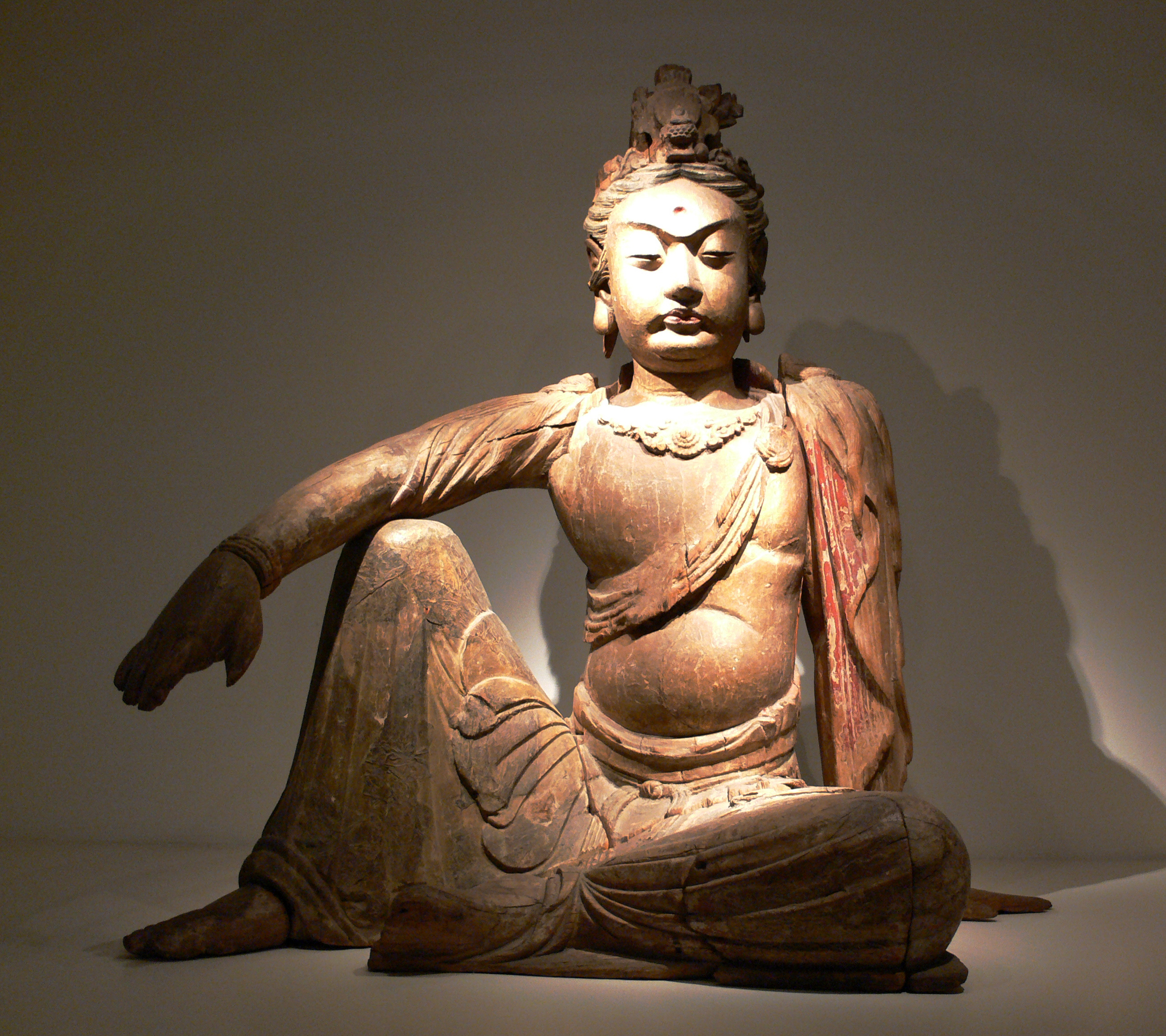
A Chinese wooden sculpture depicting Guanyin, Song dynasty, 12th century AD, Ethnological Museum of Berlin, Germany

Initially, only the Buddha was the main person or figure depicted. Bodhisattvas were later created as standalone works instead of as an attendant to the Buddha. In China, two important Bodhisattvas were Avalokiteshvara (Guanyin) and Manjushri (Wenshu) who embodied wisdom and compassion, virtues important for achieving a state of enlightenment and application of "Pure Land" or "Zen" Buddhism. During the 4th and 6th century, China was experiencing a time of war in which followers believed their devotional piety would offer guidance, health and wealth to their provinces and rulers. Deities were considered protectors of the Buddhist traditions and became more elaborate in their display as Buddhism took new forms in the following centuries.

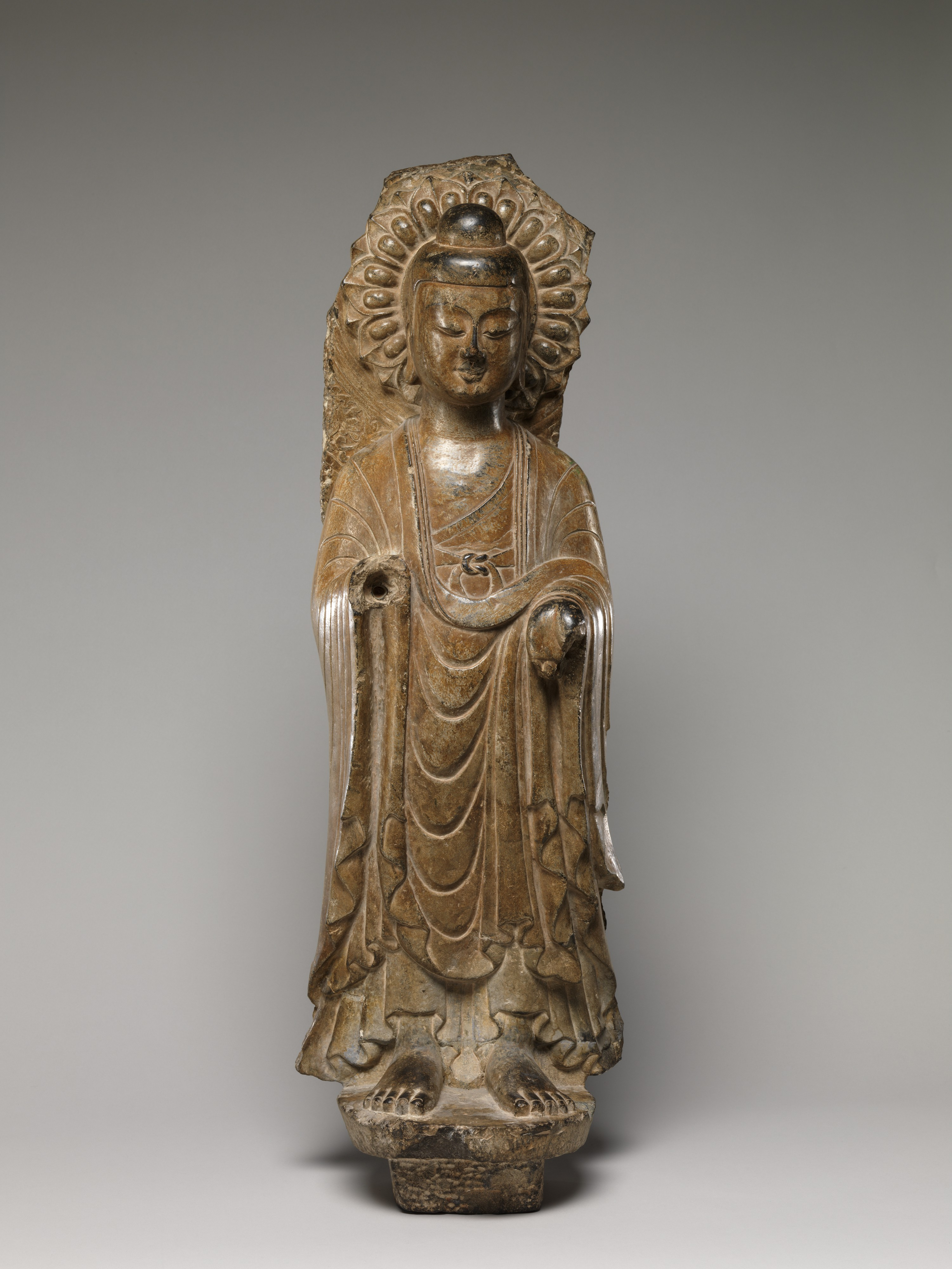
Buddha (fragment from a larger stele)

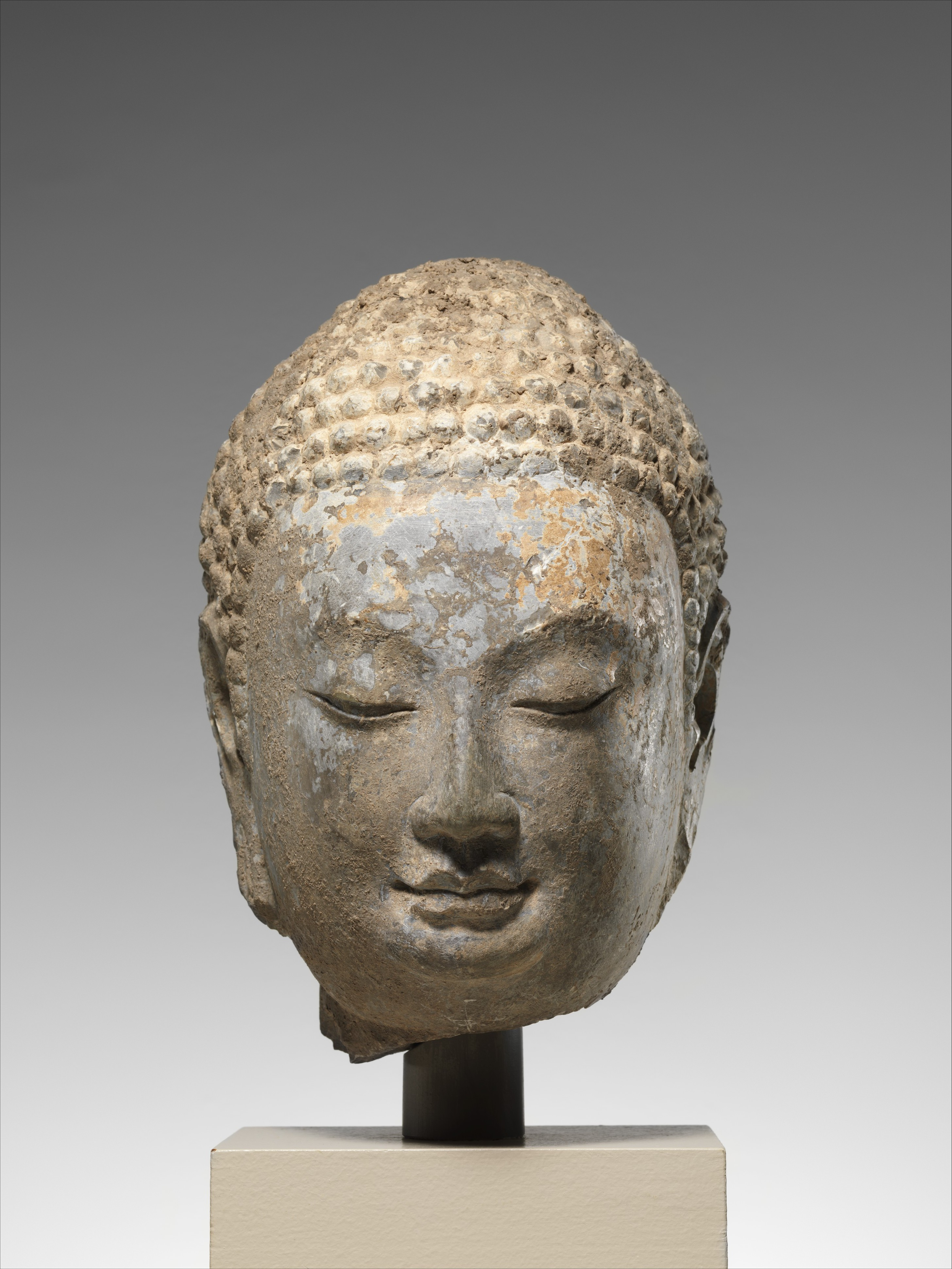
Head of a Buddha

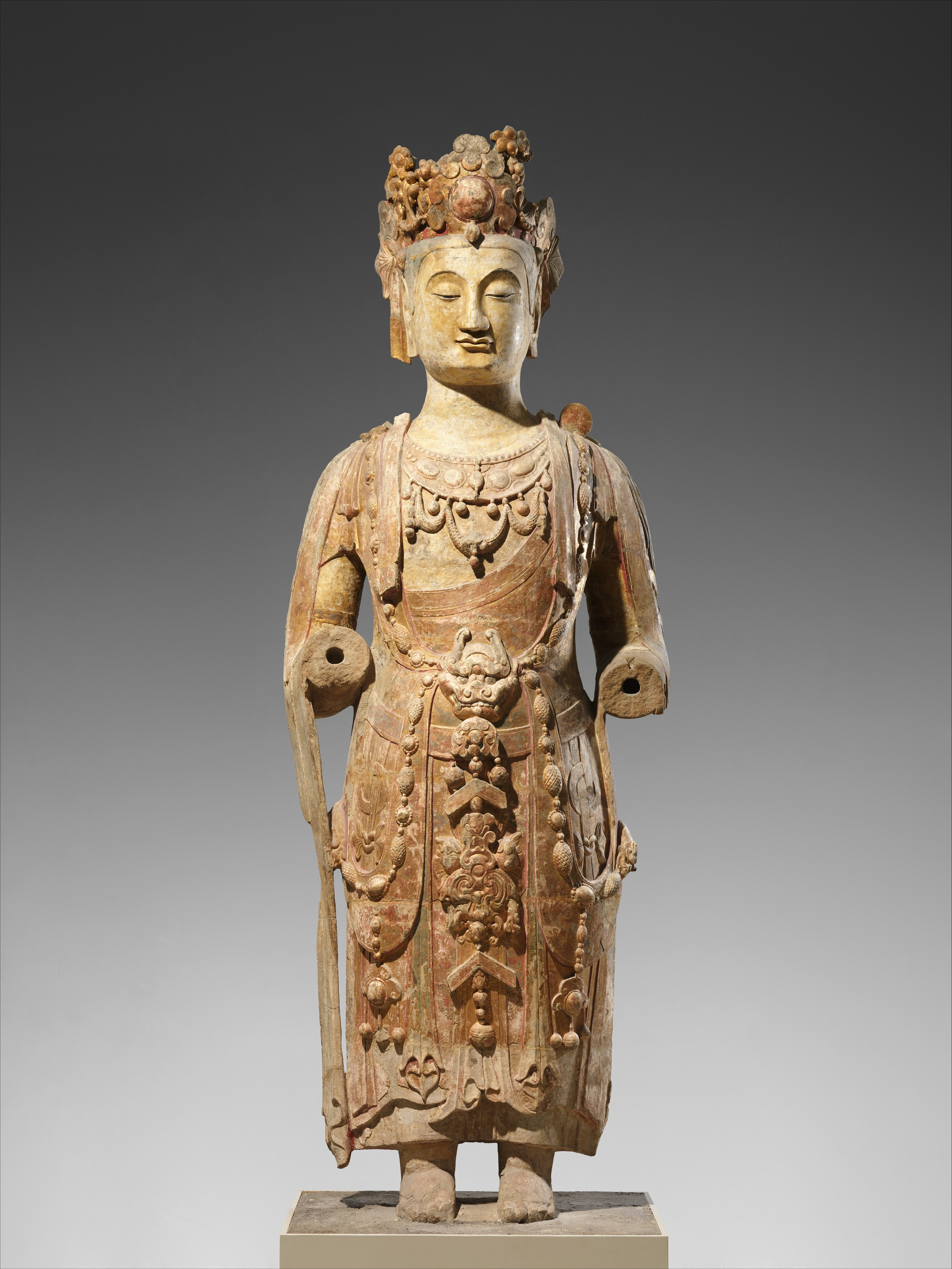
Bodhisattva, probably Avalokiteshvara (Guānyīn)

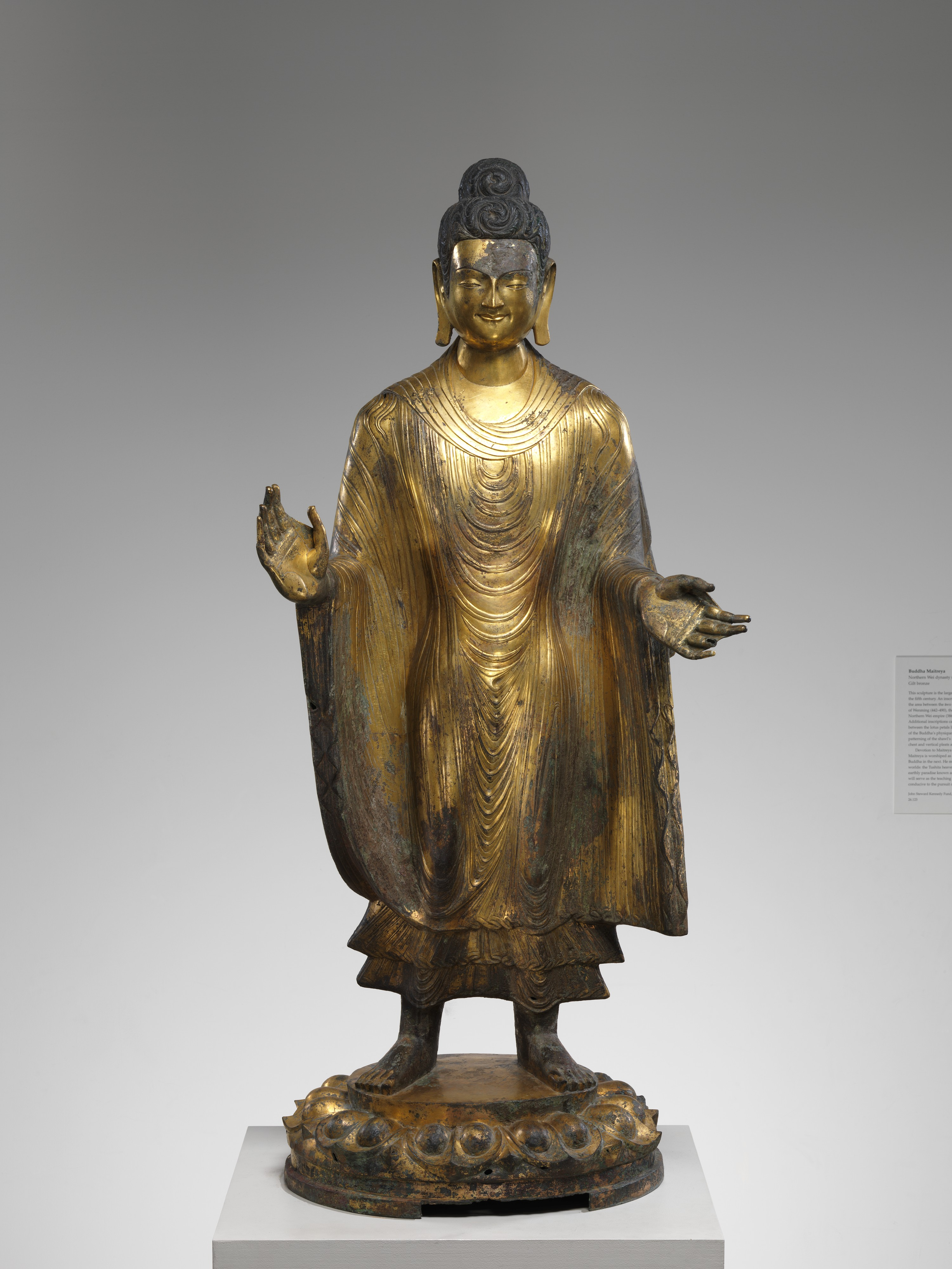
Bodhisattva Maitreya (Mílè Púsa)

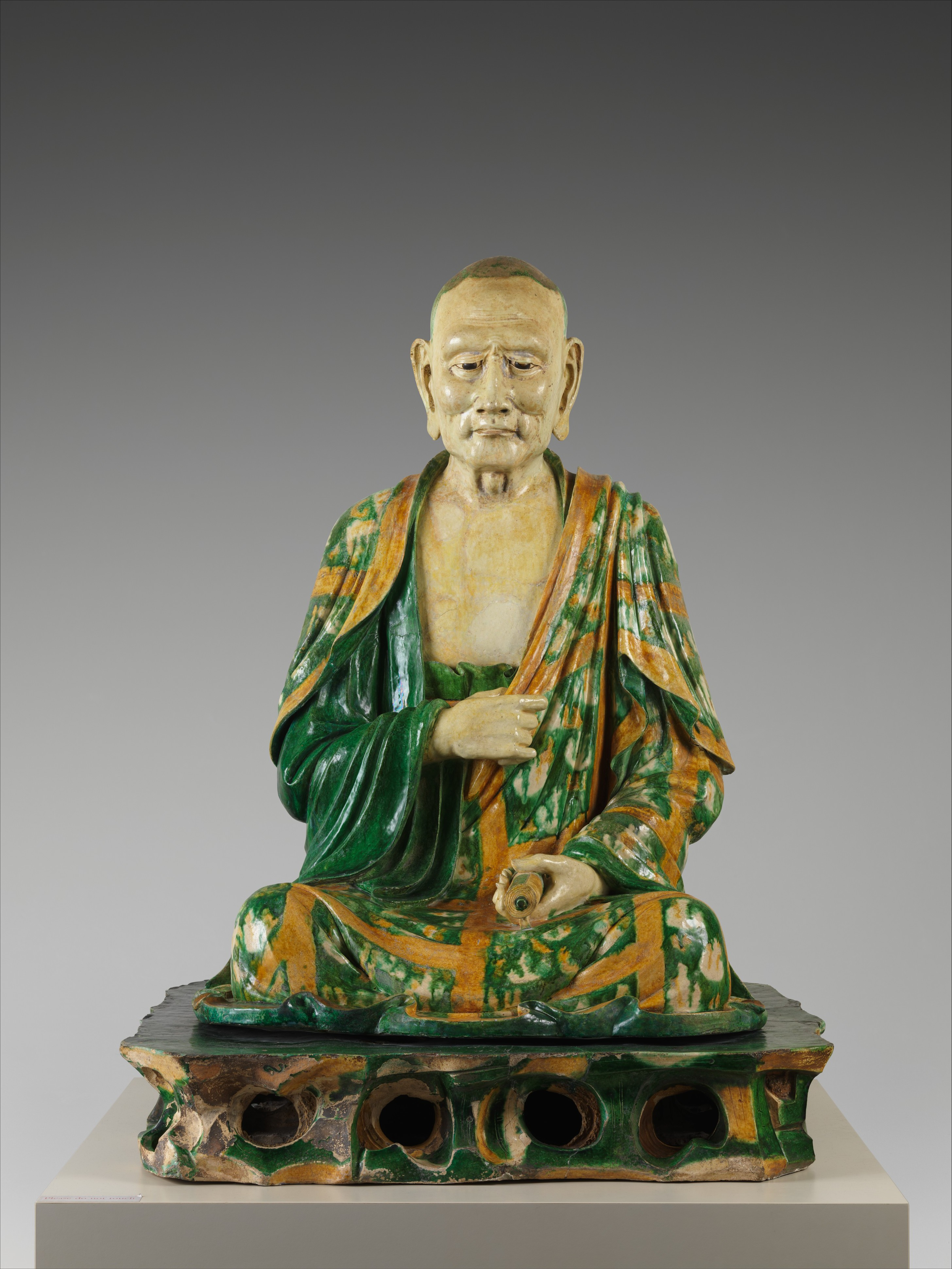
Arhat, one of the Yixian glazed pottery luohans

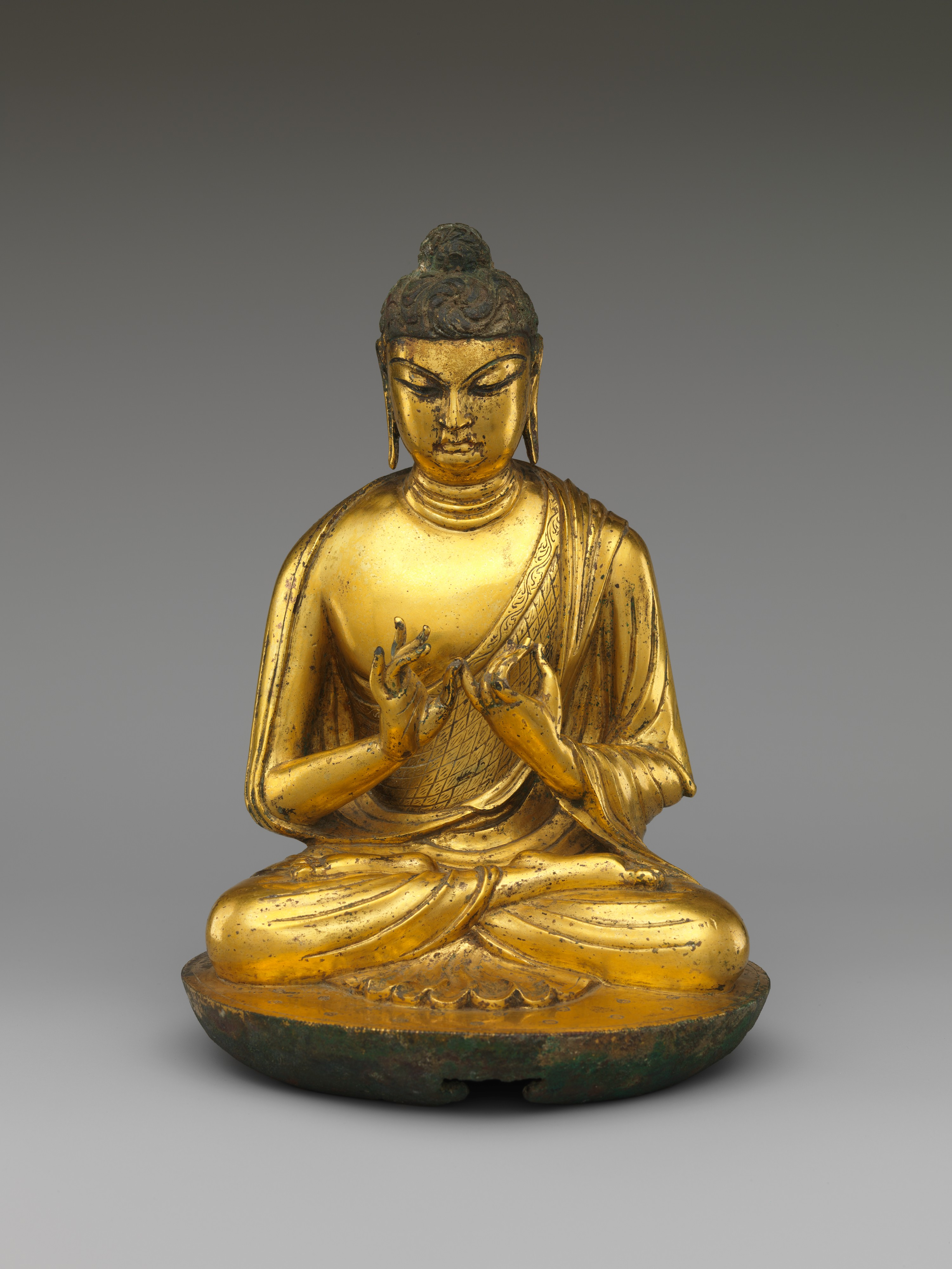
Buddha Vairocana (Dàrè Rúlái)

Bodhisattva Avalokiteshvara of the Lion's Roar, or Simhanada Avalokiteshvara (ShīHoǔ Guānyīn)

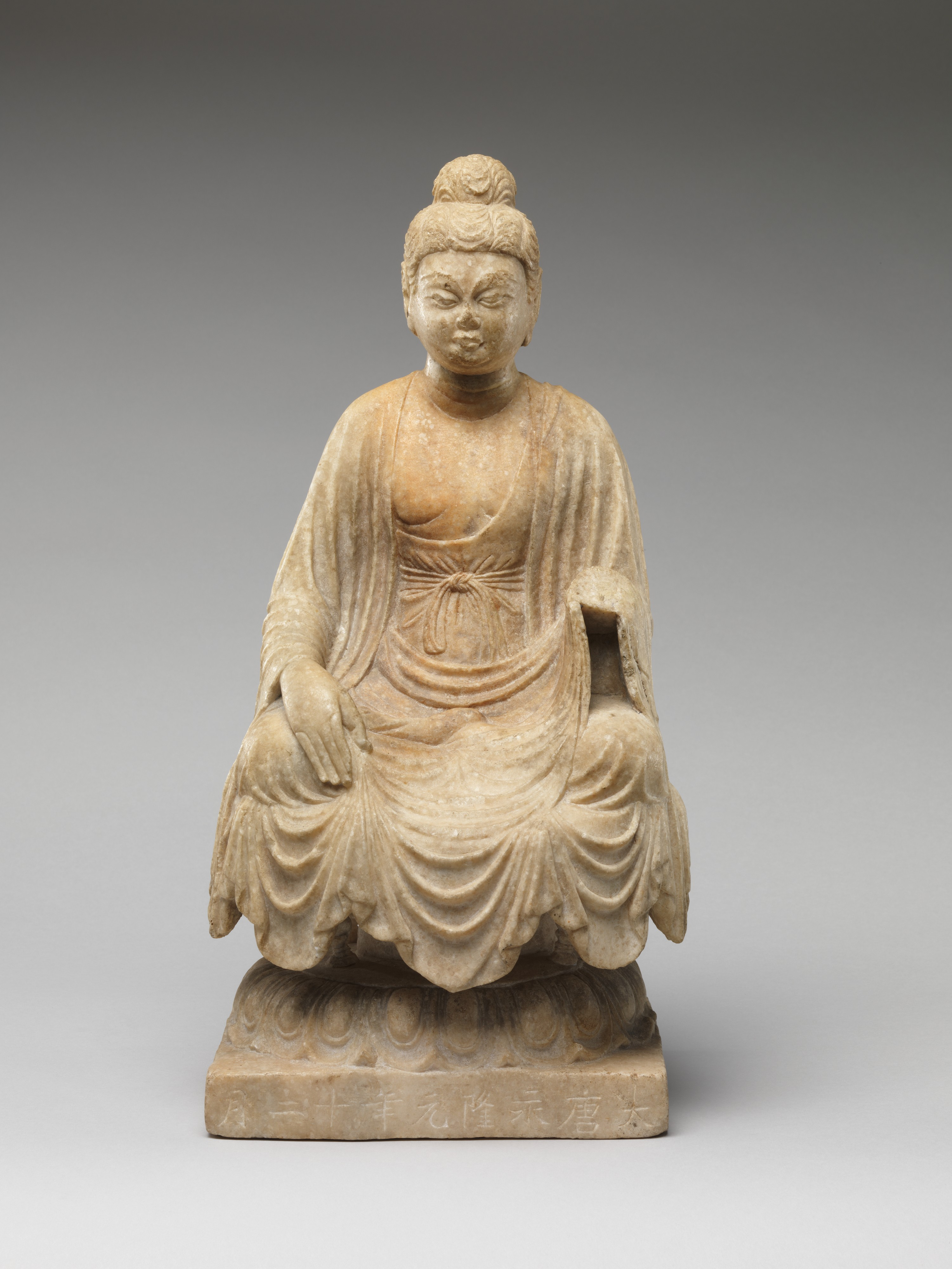
Buddha

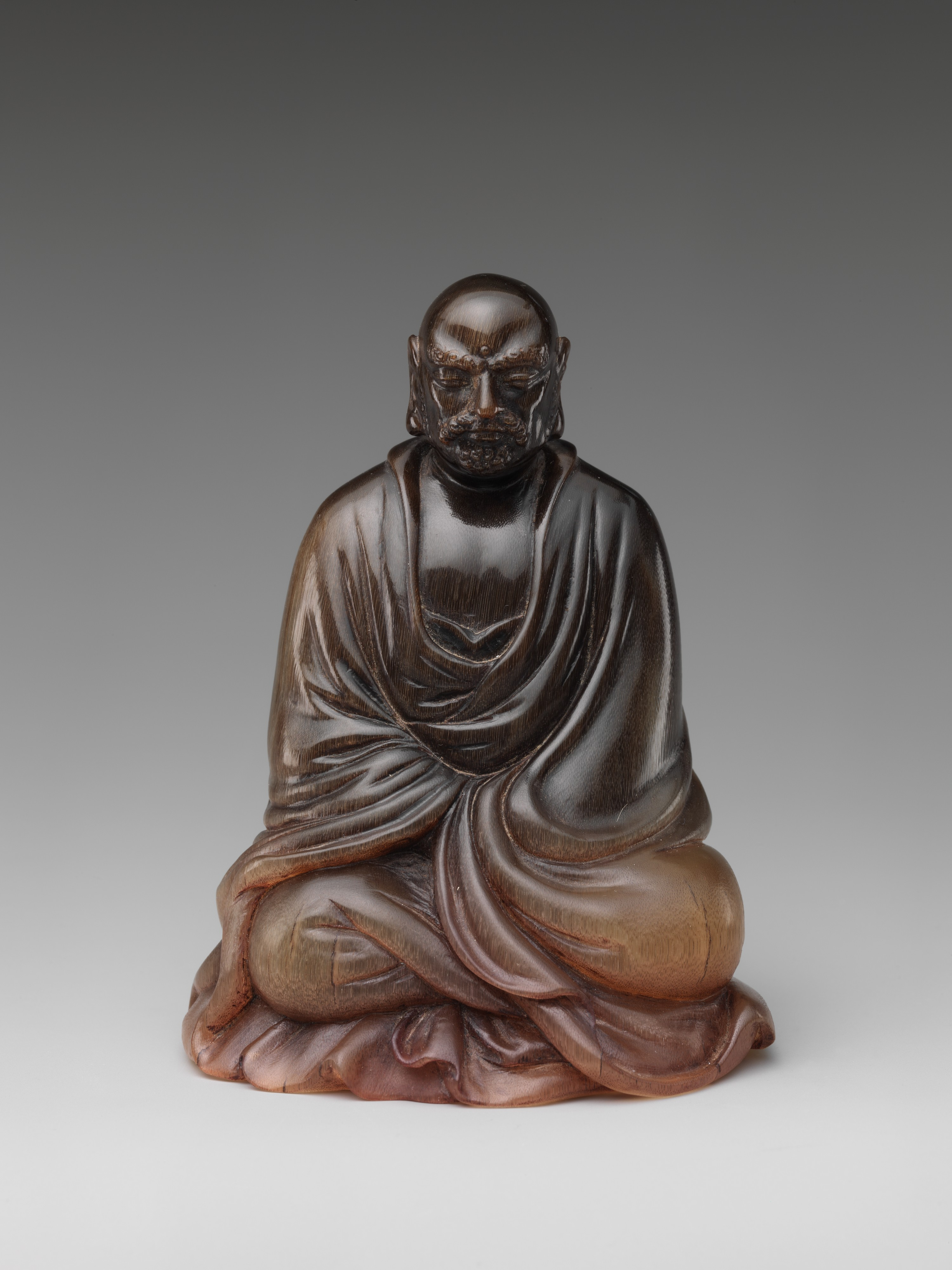
Buddhist monk Bodhidharma (Pútídámó)

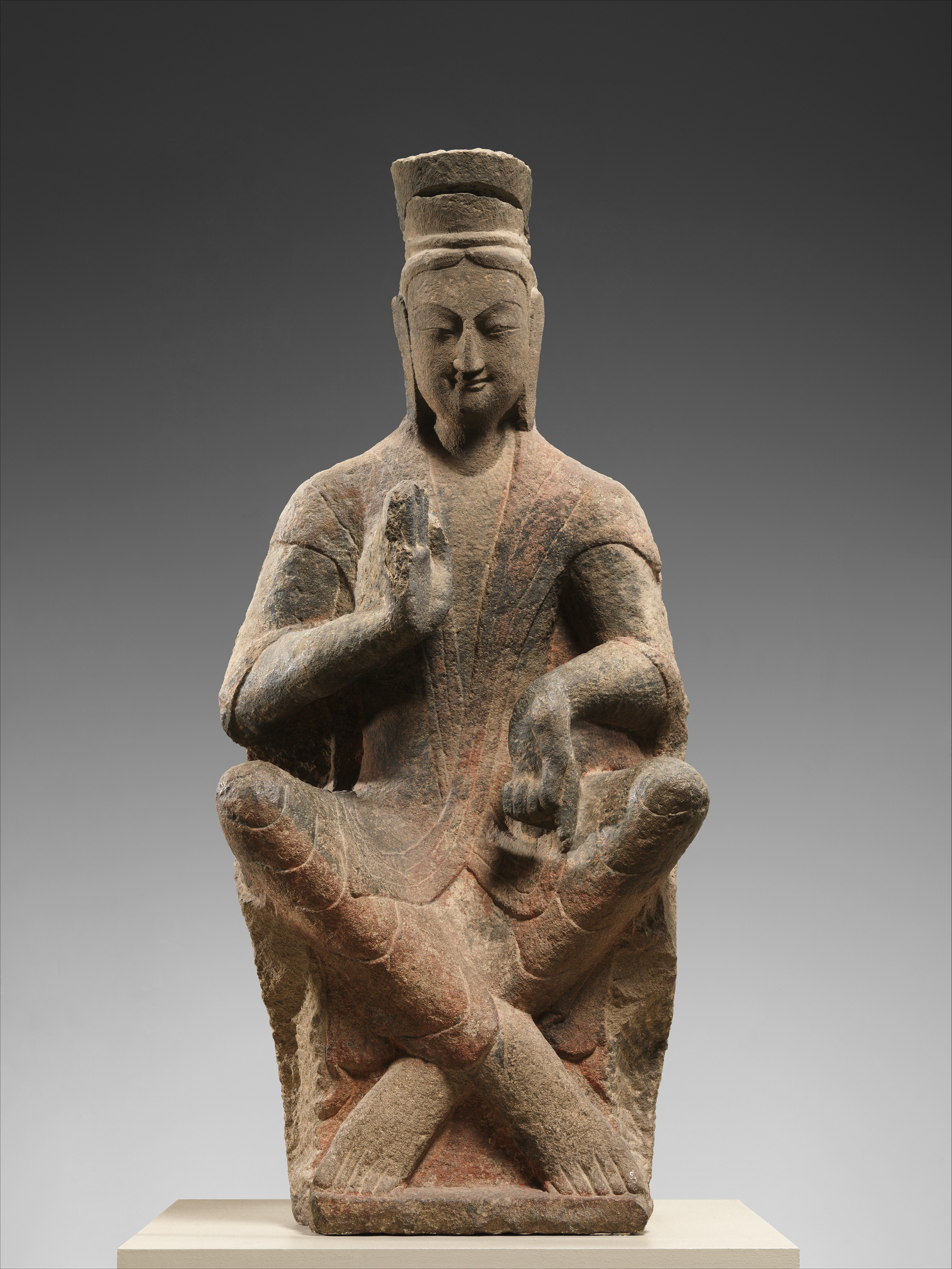
Bodhisattva with Crossed Ankles

== See also ==
- Yixian glazed pottery luohans
- Guishan Guanyin Colossal modern sculpture
- Greco-Buddhist art
- Iconography of Gautama Buddha in Laos and Thailand
- Korean Buddhist sculpture
- Lao Buddhist sculpture
- Thai Buddhist sculpture
