= Yixian glazed pottery luohans =

Set of pottery Buddhist sculptures from China

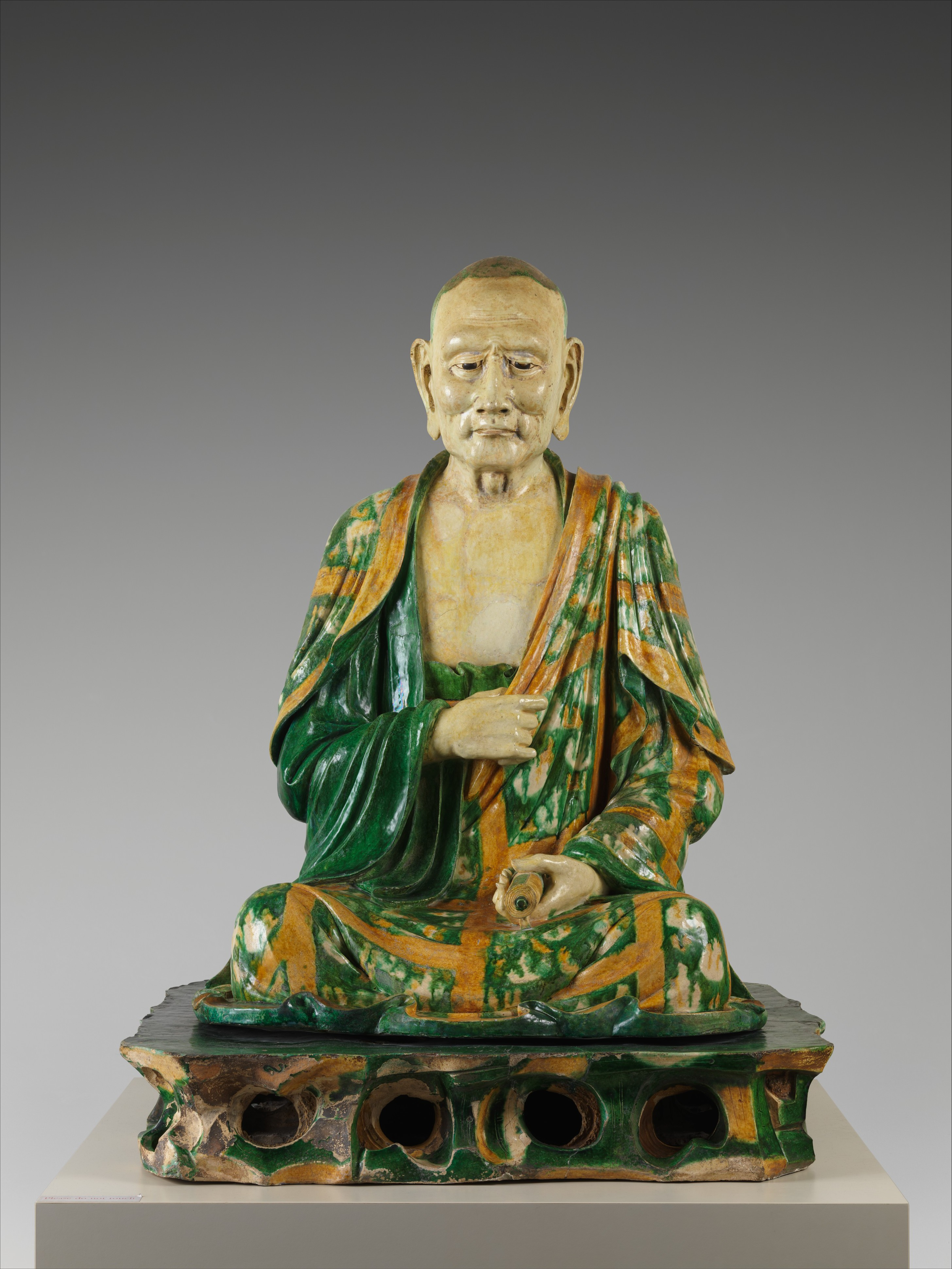
Metropolitan Museum of Art older figure

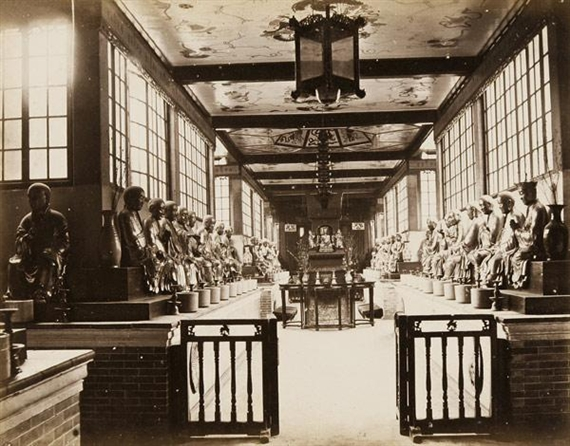
Chinese luohan hall

The Yixian glazed pottery luohans are a set of life-size glazed pottery sculptures of arhats (called luohan in Chinese) now usually regarded as originating from the Liao dynasty period (907–1125). They were apparently discovered in the early 20th century in caves at Yi County, Hebei, south of Beijing. They have been described as "one of the most important groups of ceramic sculpture in the world." They reached the international art market, and were bought for Western collections. At least eight statues were originally found, including one large fragment which was thought to have been destroyed in Berlin during World War II, but was rediscovered in the State Hermitage Museum, St Petersburg, in 2001.

Others are now in the following collections: the British Museum in London, two in the Metropolitan Museum of Art in New York, Royal Ontario Museum in Toronto, Museum of Fine Arts, Boston, Penn Museum, Philadelphia, Nelson-Atkins Museum of Art, Kansas City, the Musée Guimet in Paris, and the Sezon Museum of Modern Art, Karuizawa, Japan. Including the example rediscovered in Saint Petersburg, this totals ten figures. There may be fragments from the same set in other collections. The circumstances of the find, and the subsequent events as the figures reached the art market, have been the subject of much scholarly investigation, without being entirely clarified.

Luohan is the Chinese term for an arhat, one of the historical disciples of the Buddha. As Buddhist tradition developed, and especially in the East Asian Buddhist countries, the number of arhats tended to increase, and at least the most important were regarded as, or as almost, bodhisattvas or fully enlightened beings, with a wide range of supernatural powers. According to Buddhist tradition, groups of 16, 18 or 500 luohans awaited the arrival of Maitreya, the Future Buddha, and groups were often used in East Asian Buddhist art. The full set of the so-called "Yixian luohans" is thought by most scholars to have had figures for the typical Chinese main grouping of Sixteen or Eighteen Arhats, although William Watson describes this "usual assumption" as "speculative". These and earlier smaller groupings of six or eight were each given names and personalities in Buddhist tradition.

This set is exceptional in its quality and the sculpted-from-life individuality of each figure, and it has been suggested that they were also portraits of notable contemporary monks. For Watson they are "outstanding examples of the naturalistic pseudo-portrait of the period, displaying to great perfection an idealization of the face", where "only the elongation of the ear-lobes follows [traditional Buddhist] iconography". The green hair of some of the figures is also a departure from naturalism. The alleged findspot in 1912 seems not to have been the original location of the group, which is unknown, and the set of 16 or 18 figures was probably made to be set on platforms along the walls of a "luohan hall" in a temple. The openwork rock-like bases were intended to suggest mountains; paintings of luohans often show them perched on small peaks, indicating the mountain retreats of the ascetic monk.

== Gallery ==
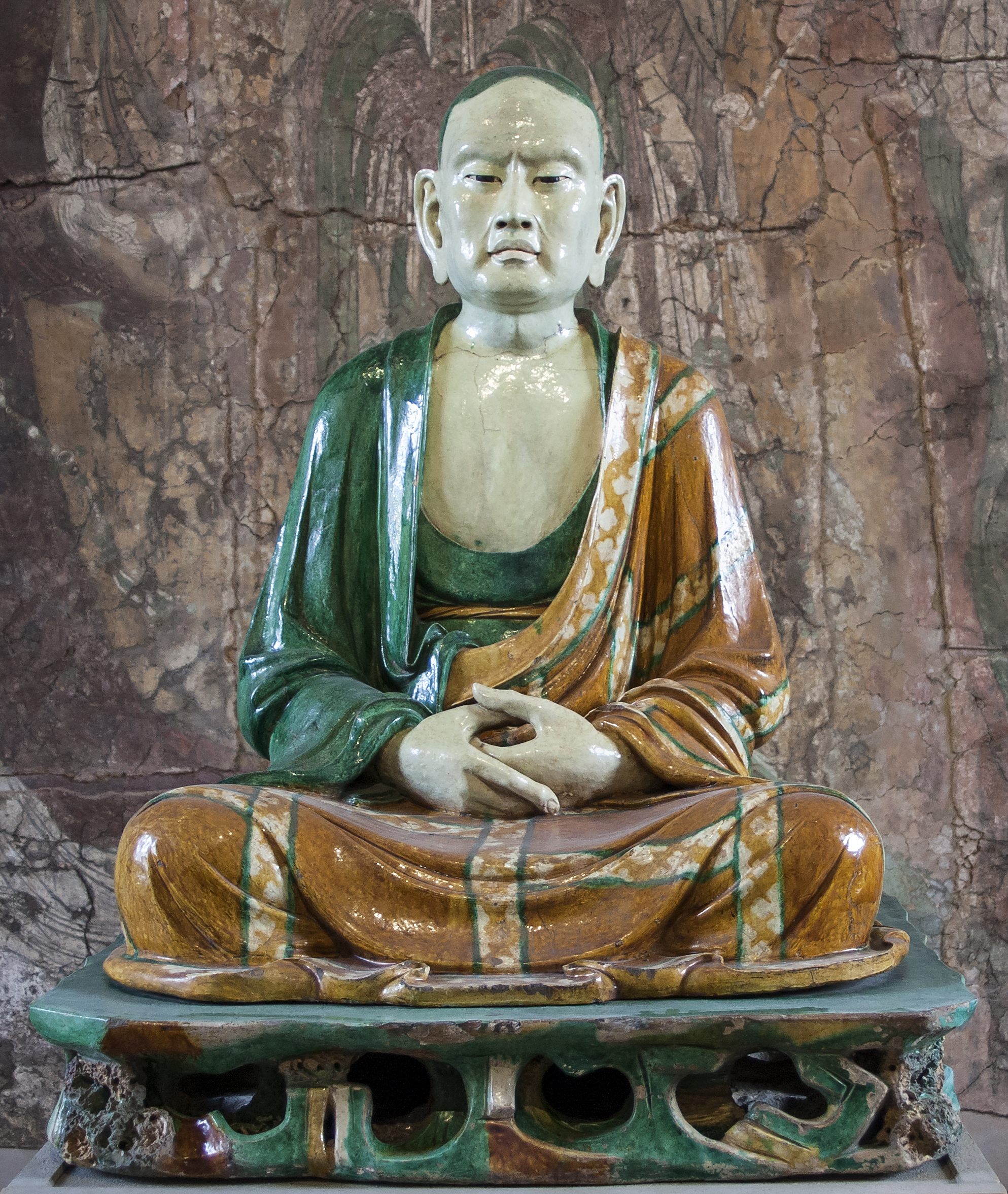
British Museum, Seated Luohan from Yixian

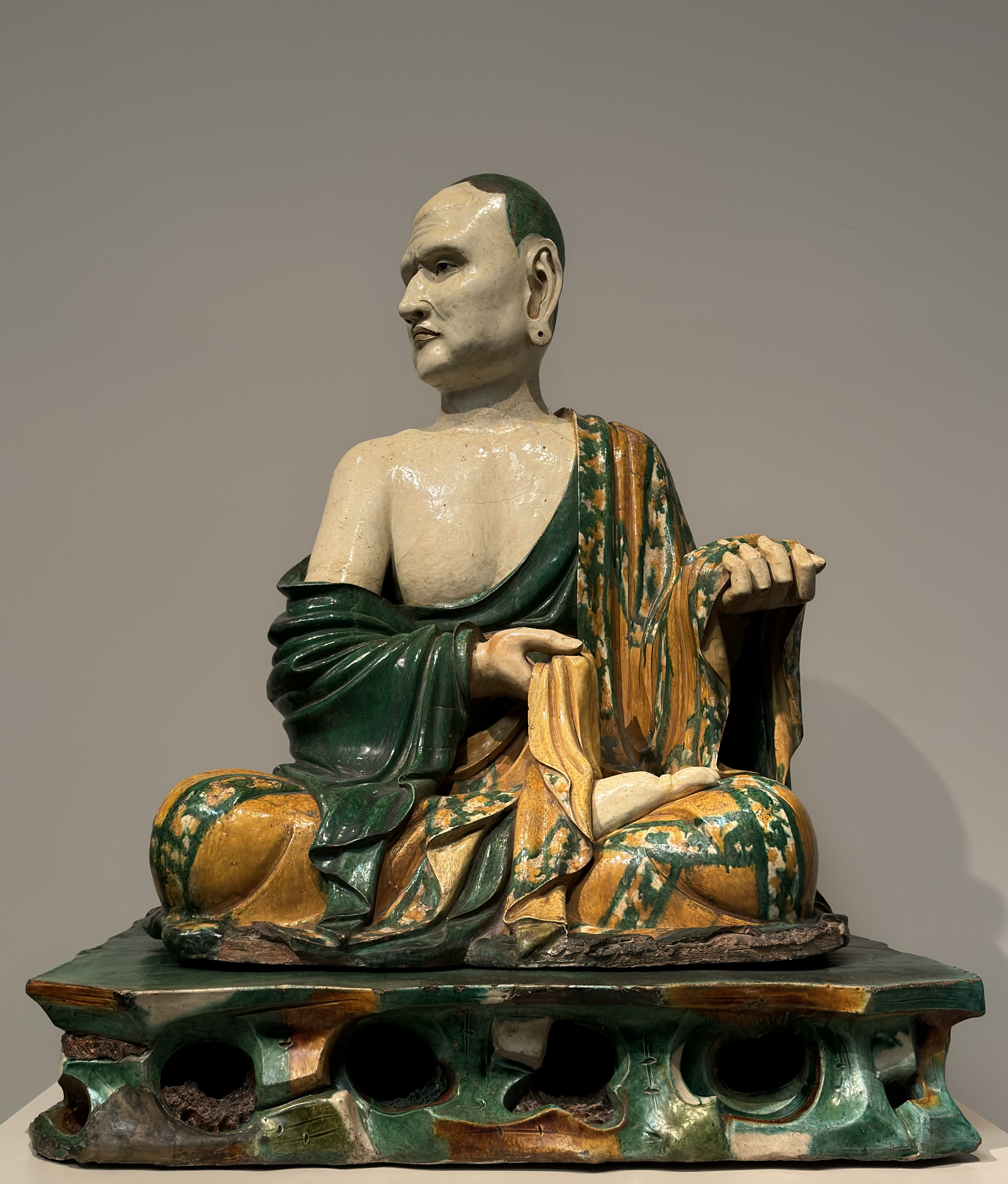
Yixian luohan from the Metropolitan Museum of Art, his head turned sharply to his right

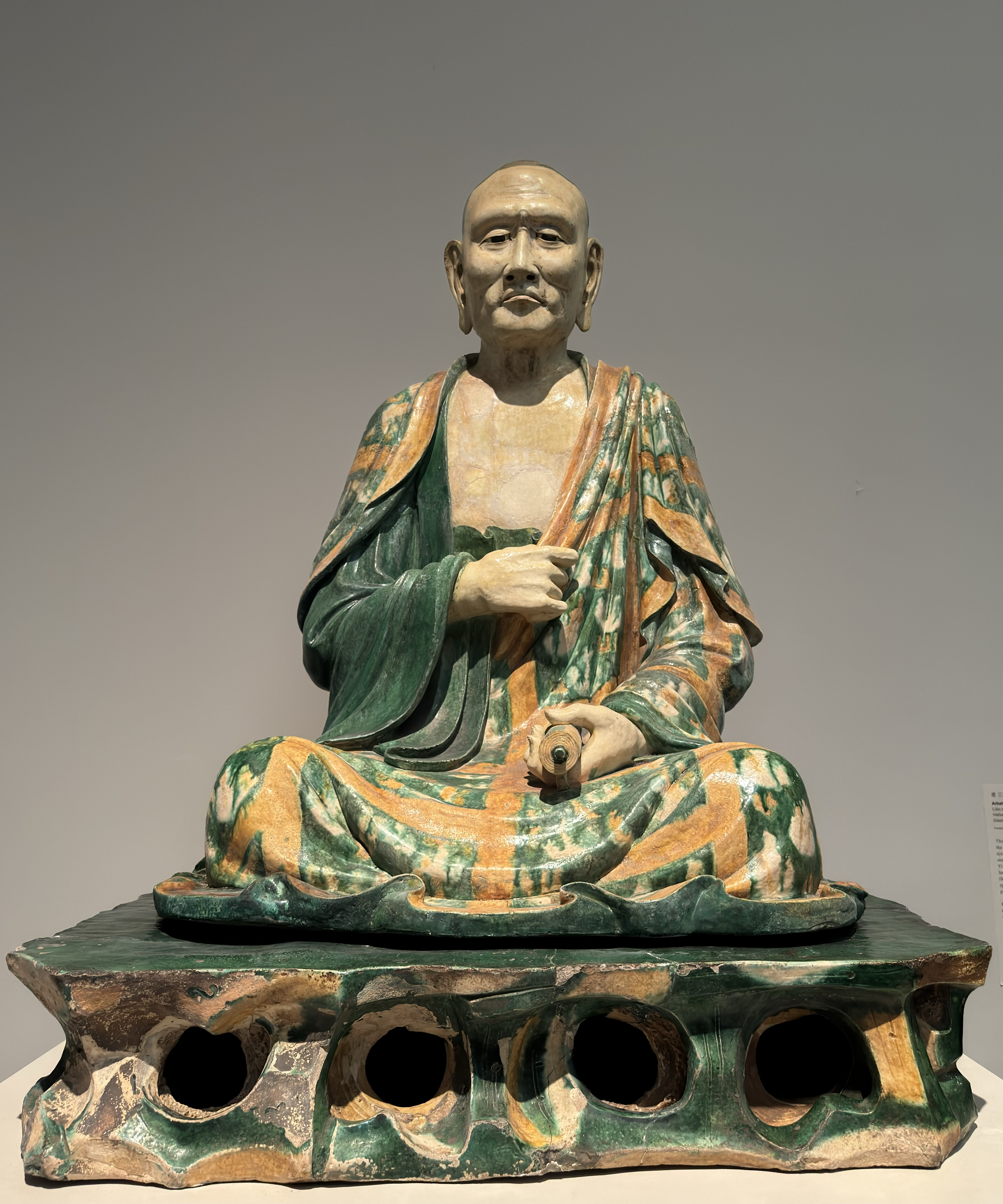
Another at the Metropolitan from the same set, depicting an older monk

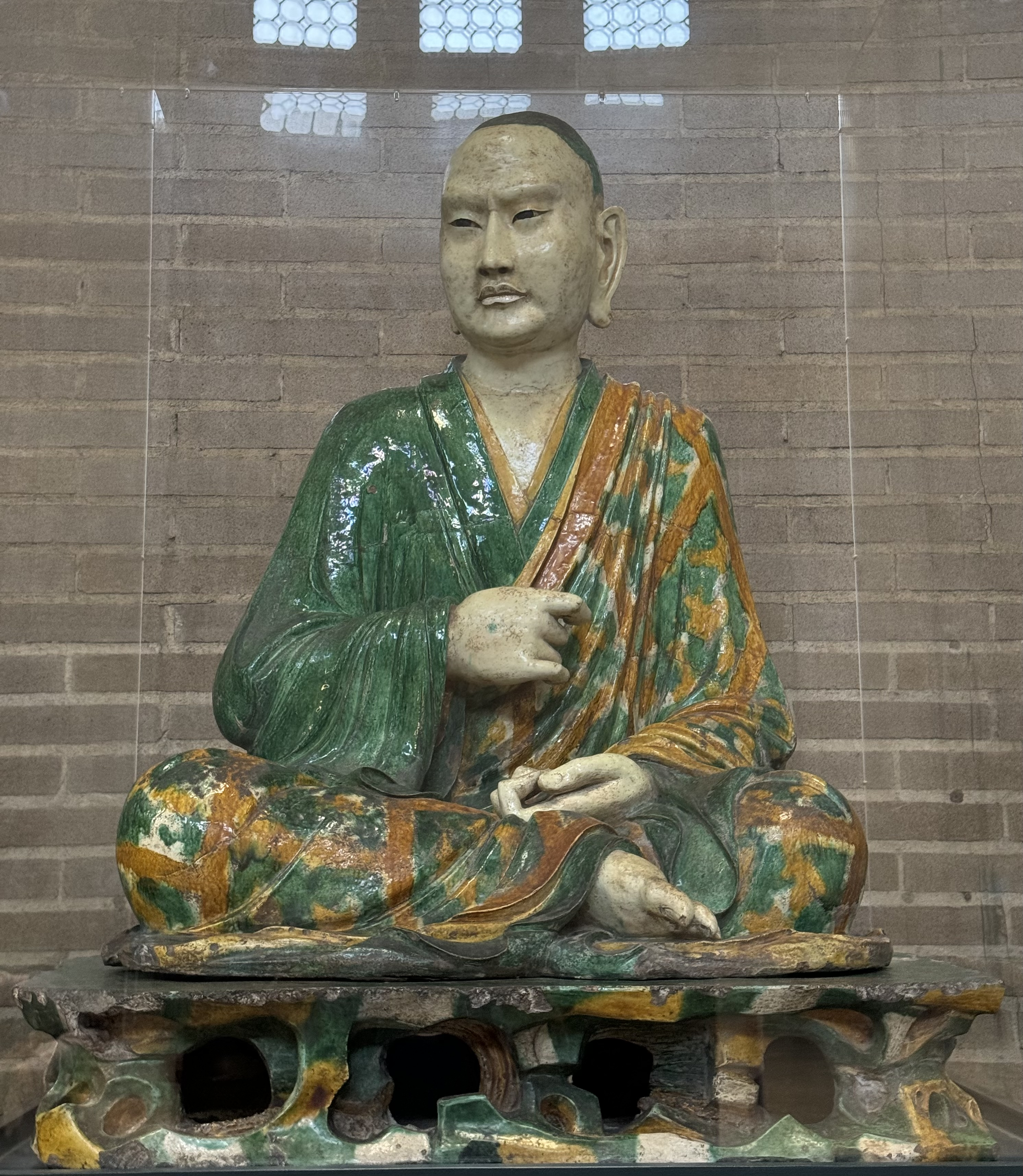
The Penn Museum luohan

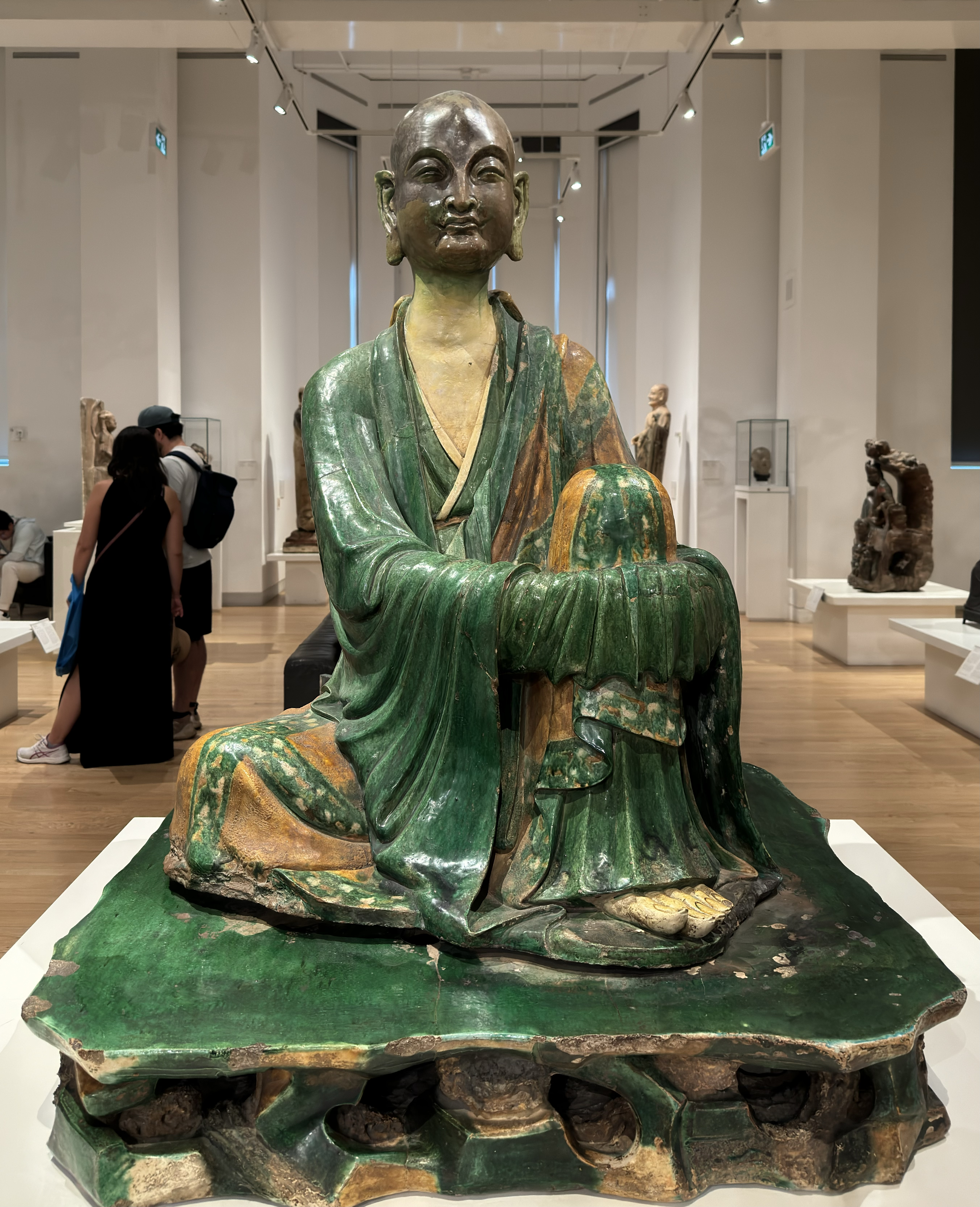
Luohan at the Royal Ontario Museum in Toronto, with later head

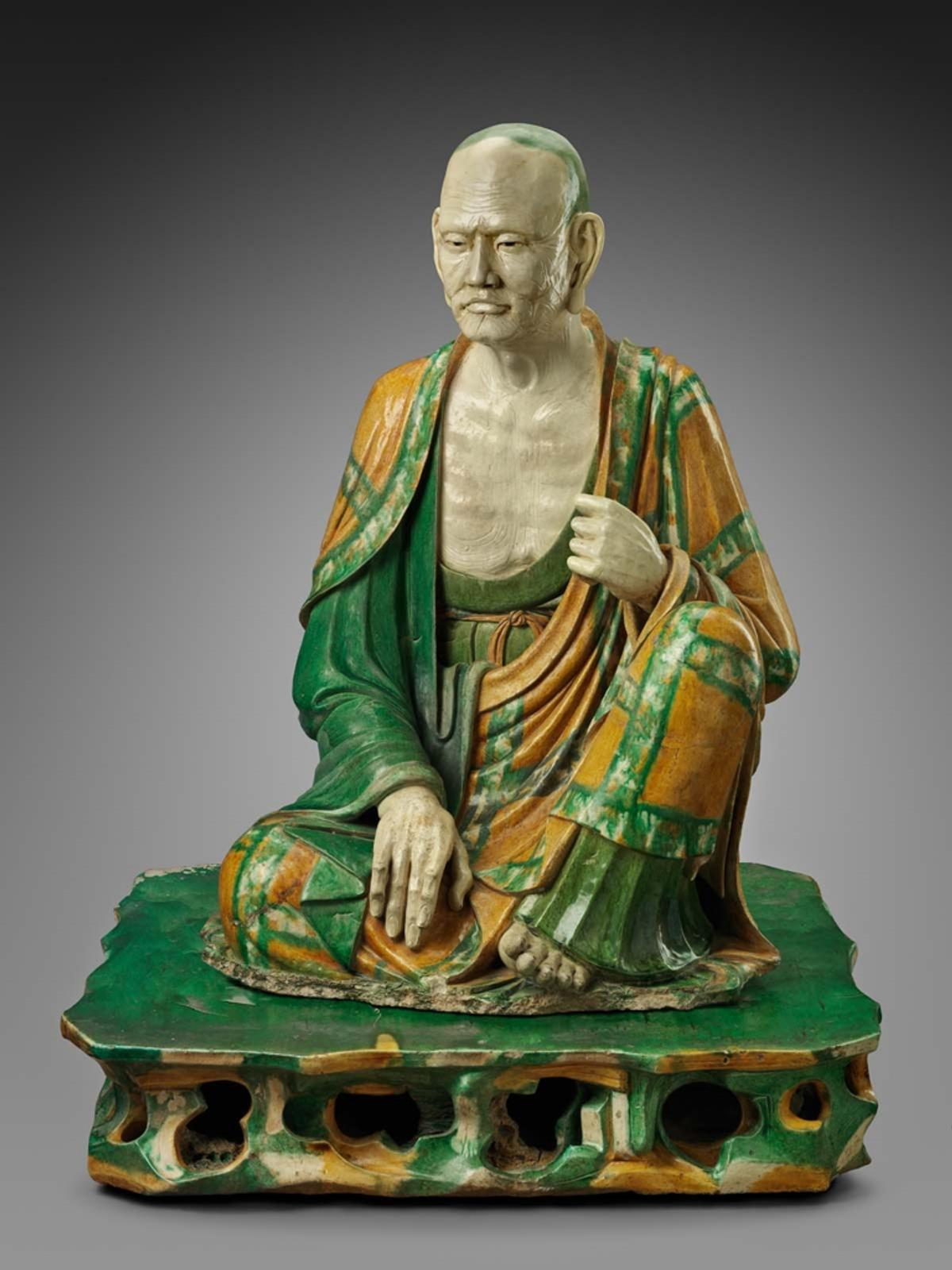
Boston Museum of Fine Arts Luohan with remodelled head

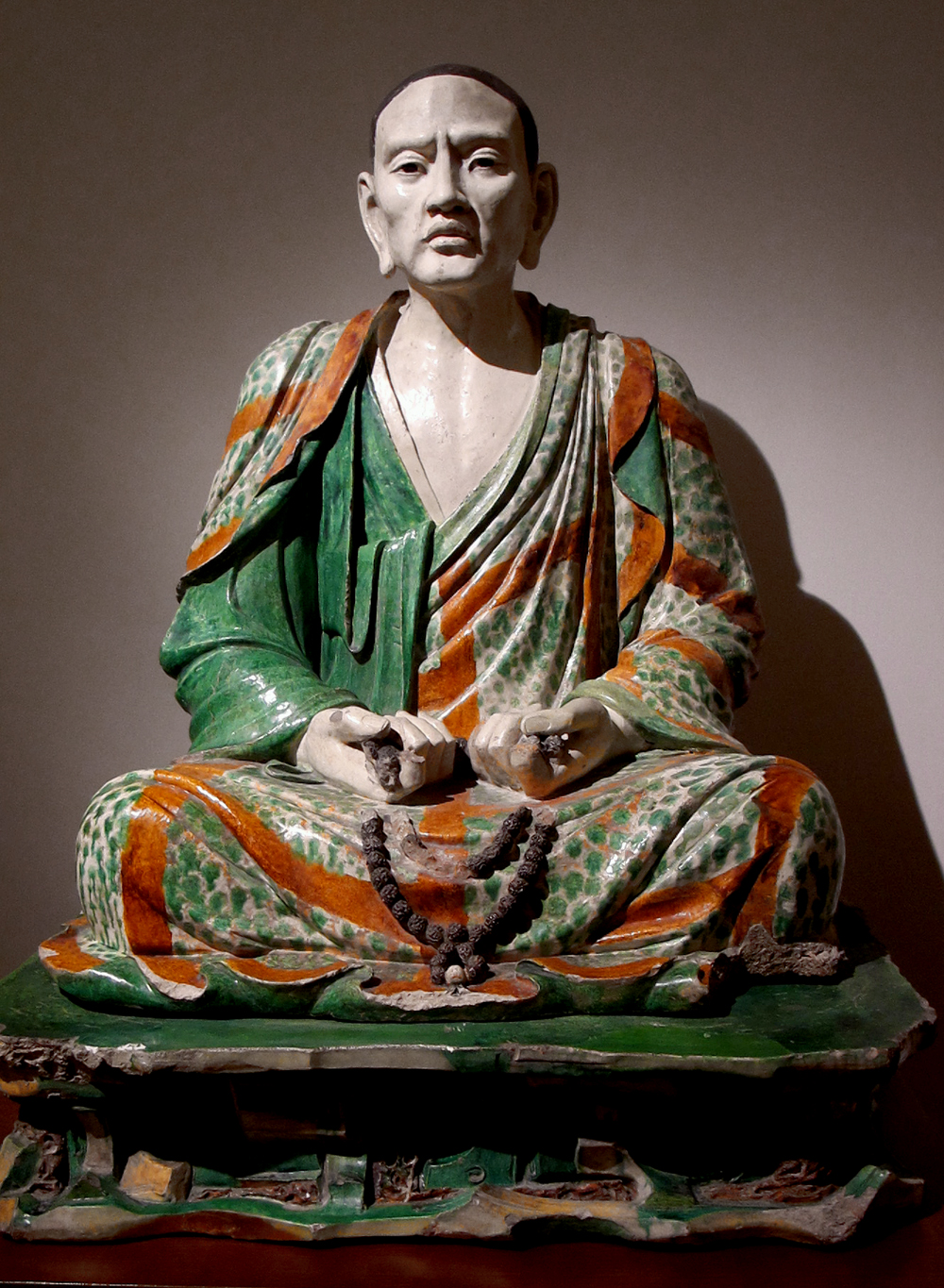
Paris Luohan (sometimes not considered part of the group)

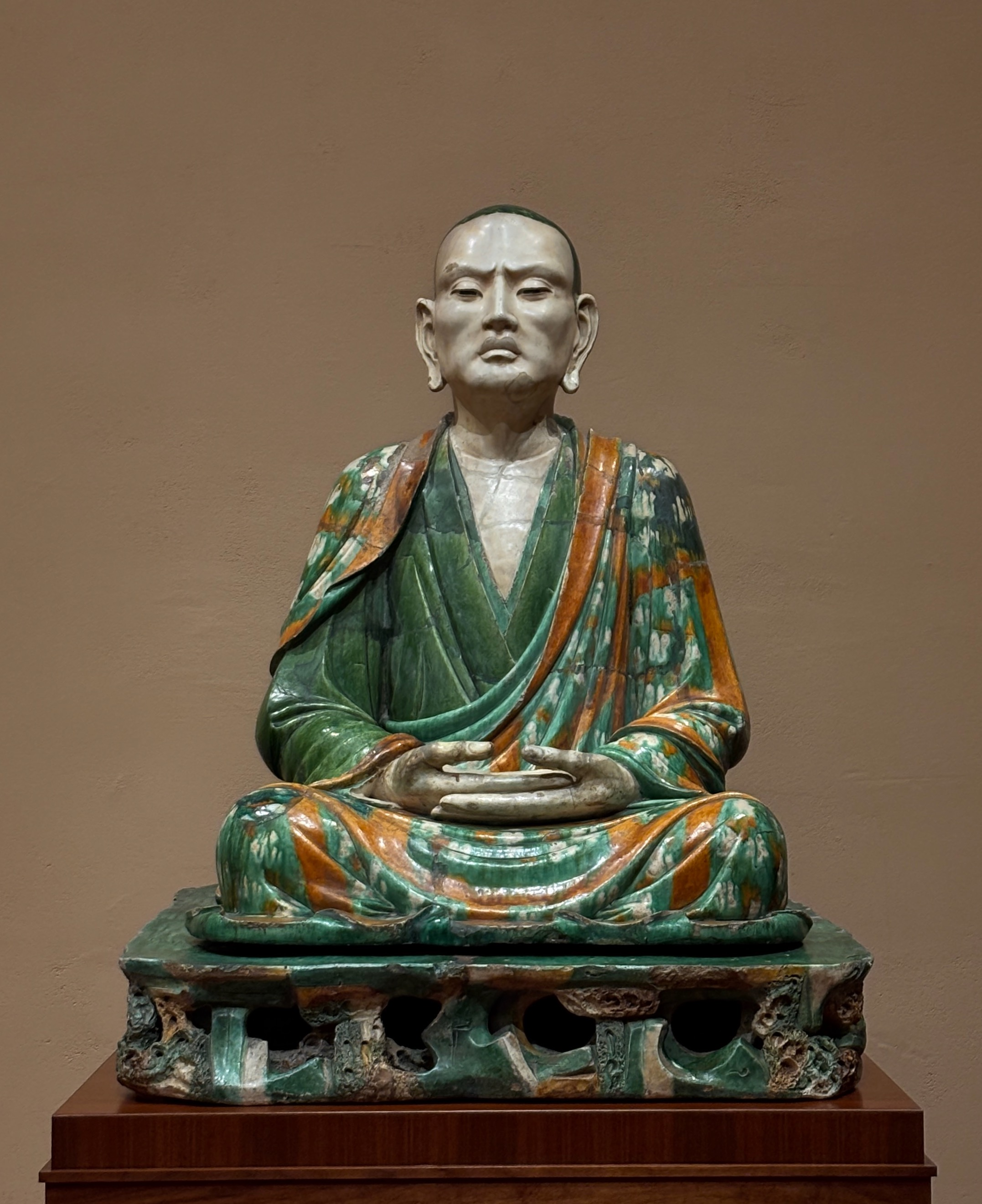
Luohan at Nelson-Atkins Museum of Art (34-6)

== Dating ==
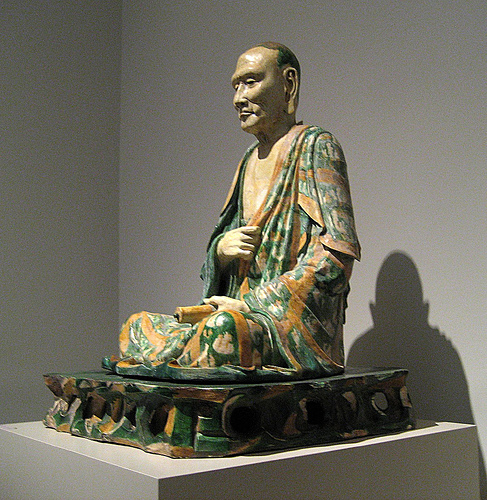
The older of the New York figures, from the side

In their first years in the West the figures were usually assigned to the Tang dynasty (618–907), with some proposing various later dates in the Ming dynasty period and those of the dynasties in between. But a date in the regional Liao dynasty (916–1125 CE) came to be preferred, although in recent years they are increasingly, partly because of the results of scientific dating methods, placed in the early 12th century, which is mostly in the following Jin dynasty (1115–1234) period.

Thermoluminescence dating tests of the statues in Philadelphia and New York (younger figure) produced a midpoint date of 1210, ± 100 and 200 years respectively, the midpoint being during the period of the following Jin dynasty. In 2011 Derek Gillman tentatively suggested the specific date of 1159, to match the recorded renovation of a large temple in the region, which he proposed as a candidate for their original location. In a 2013 lecture to the Oriental Ceramic Society, Gillman noted that the figures' pale coloured lips have an iron red ceramic glaze, first used on Chinese ceramics during the second half of the 12th century, arguing now that the set was created during the Shizong reign (1161–89) for the Daqingshou temple (simplified Chinese: 大庆寿寺; traditional Chinese: 大慶壽寺), a newly established, imperially commissioned Chan Buddhist temple in Beijing. An early 12th-century coin was also found inside a robe fold of the Boston figure, together with eight others including five from the 8th century; coins often remained in circulation long after they were minted.

A significantly different dating is proposed by Hsu, based mainly on inscriptions on stone stelae which she connects to the figures. The earliest of these records the completion in 1519 of a number of figures commissioned by a Song Jun; these had taken eight years to make. Another stele dated 1667 records the repair of Buddhist figures; Hsu argues this is when at least some of the replacement heads were added.

== History in the art world ==
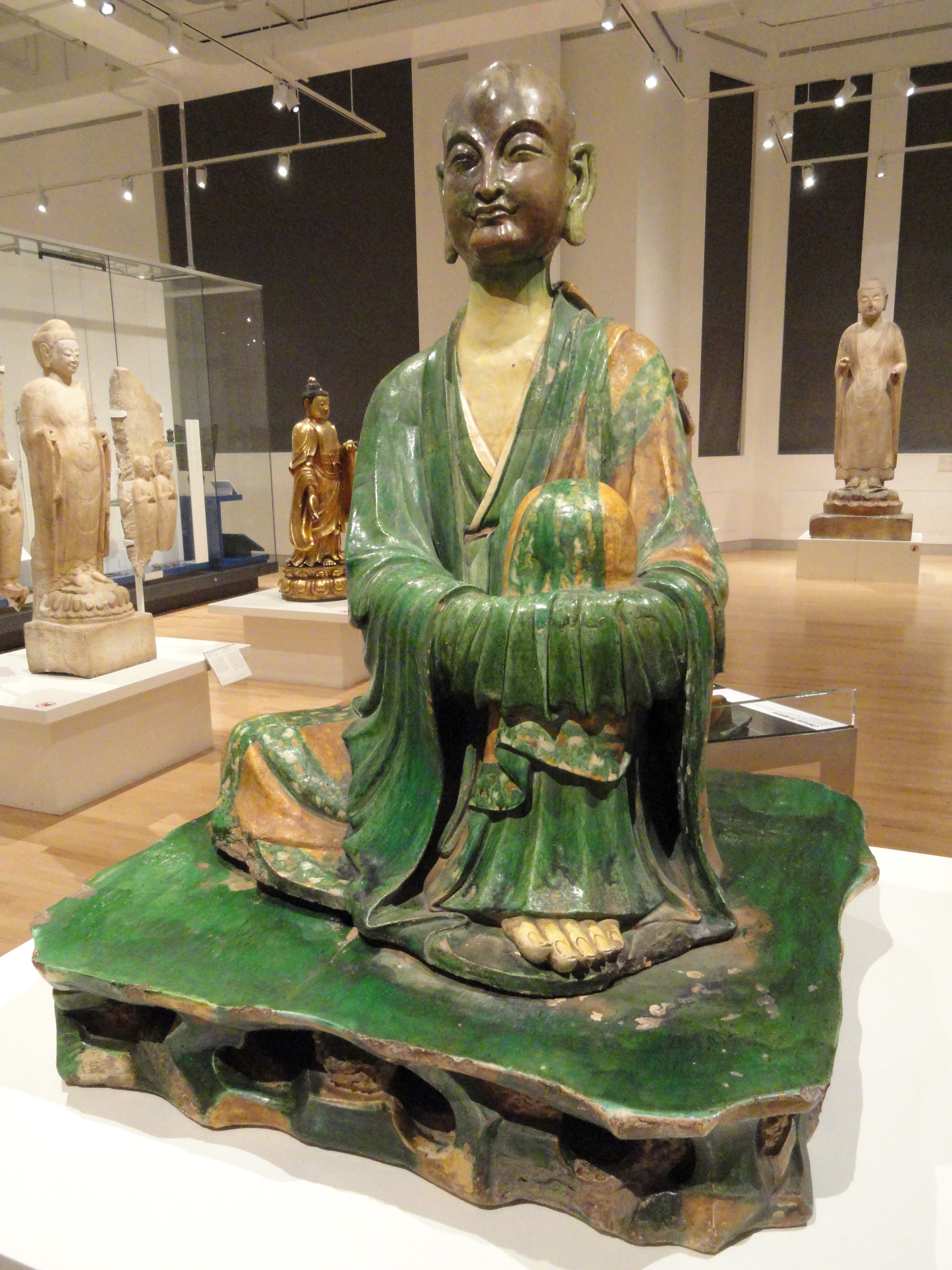
Luohan at Royal Ontario Museum

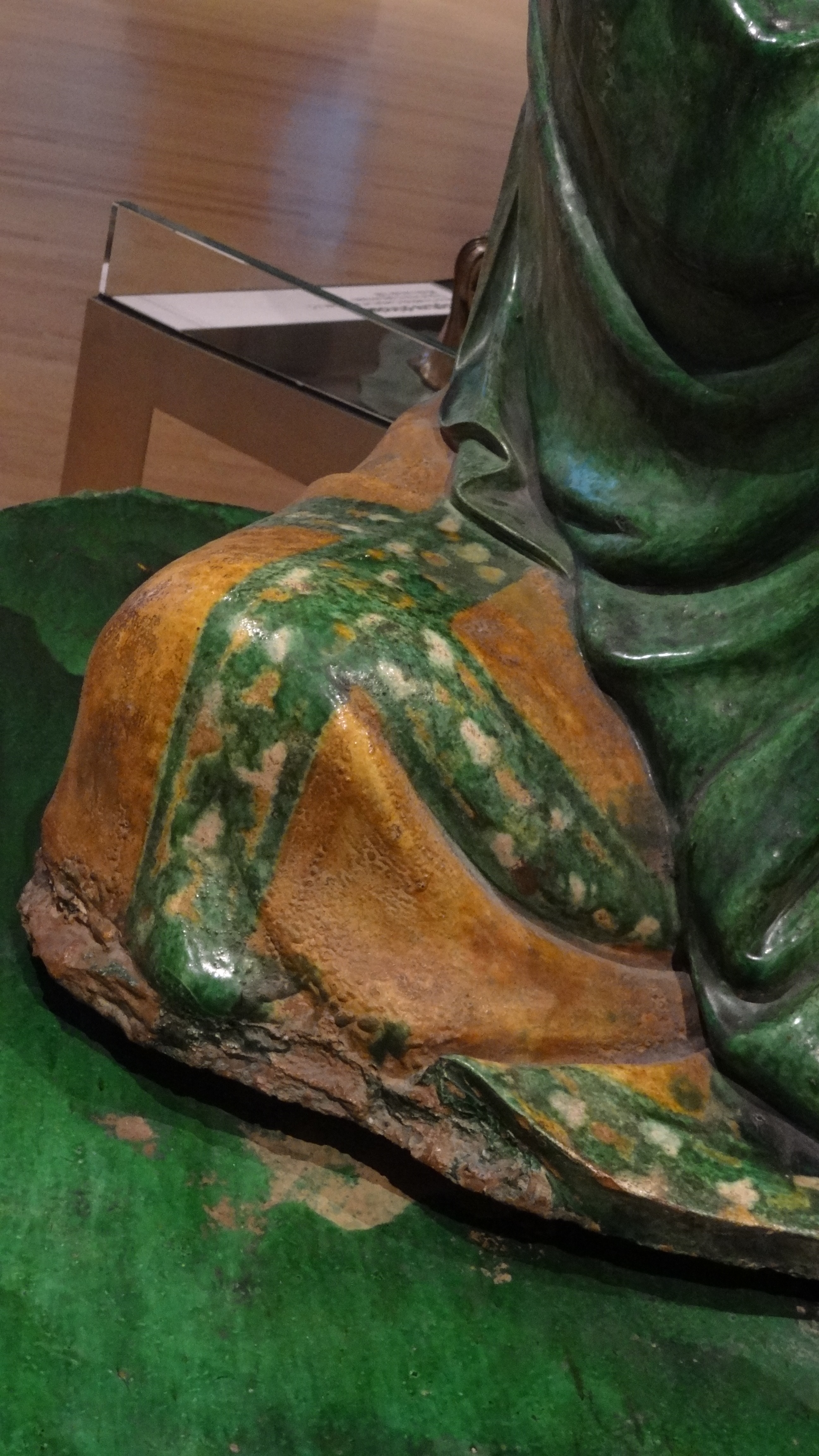
Detail from Royal Ontario Museum

The figures were reportedly in the hands of Chinese dealers who told the German sinologist Friedrich Perzynski about them in 1912, and subsequently showed him examples, some of which he bought and exported to Europe. They had apparently been found in one or more caves near Yixian, Hebei, some 100 miles south-west of Beijing in northwestern China. Perzynski claimed that he visited the cave the luohans had come from, by which time only a few fragments remained there. He described the episode in an article for Deutsche Rundschau soon after, repeating his story in a book published a few years later, but the veracity of his account has been challenged in recent years.

In 1913 two figures were exhibited in Paris (without their bases), and a third (with base) was acquired by the British Museum in 1914, see Seated Luohan from Yixian. Now six figures are in museums in North America, with two surviving and one missing or destroyed in Europe, and one of the set in Japan. The Metropolitan acquired its two examples separately in 1921, by which time Boston, Philadelphia, Toronto and the Matsukata Collection in Japan already had theirs, and a further four were "owned by private collectors and dealers", so making a total of ten figures, "besides a great many small fragments, several hands and feet, and baskets full of broken pieces".

The figure long thought lost from the Museum für Ostasiatische Kunst in Berlin is a head and bust length fragment, 60 cm high, of a younger man with his head turned to his left, and his shoulder bared. In his 2011 lecture Derek Gillman reported that Stanley Abe, a fellow specialist, had recently been shown it in a storeroom of the Hermitage Museum in St Petersburg. The figure in Paris is an uncertain member of the group, very similar overall, but with differences in the posture of the shoulders and its stippled design on the robes. Many scholars question whether it really belongs with the group.

To a surprising degree, the number of surviving pieces differs between sources. Most older sources say there were eight, including the Berlin figure. Three of these, those in Boston, Japan and Ontario, are reported to have later heads. This may explain why William Watson in 2000 wrote that "Five Luohan in sancai pottery are preserved in Western museums", presumably excluding the example in Japan. The group of nine as listed by Laurence Sickman and others includes the examples from Berlin (as "present location unknown") and Japan (as "Matsukata Collection") but excludes the one now in Paris. By 2010 Gillman says what is presumably the same Japanese example was in the "Saizon Museum of Modern Art" (more usually "Sezon").

Several of the current museum web pages mention a group of eight, probably counting Berlin, plus the Metropolitan Museum of Art (with two) in New York City, British Museum in London, Nelson-Atkins Museum of Art in Kansas City, Boston Museum of Fine Arts, the Royal Ontario Museum in Toronto, Ontario, and Penn Museum in Philadelphia. The current Penn Museum webpage lists eight surviving figures, including the "Matsukata Collection" but excluding Paris and Berlin. Lecturing in 2011, Derek Gillman, then executive director and President of the Barnes Foundation, said there were "nine known examples; there's a tenth which may be part of the group, and three are known, believed, to have been broken".

The luohan at the Royal Ontario Museum, in the Bishop White Gallery of Chinese Temple Art, was one of the first pieces to be included in the museum's Chinese art collection. Although the piece dates back to the Liao dynasty (916–1125 CE), its tri-colour glaze of green, amber, and cream, is reminiscent of elements from Tang dynasty sculptures.

== Technique ==
The dimensions of the figures vary somewhat; taking the younger of the two in New York as an example, they are: height of the figure alone 50 in. (127 cm); including the base the height is 92 in. (233.7 cm). The base is 41 in. (104.1 cm) wide and 38 in. (96.5 cm) deep. The whole piece weighs 450 lbs (204.1 kg).

The statues are assembled from several pieces of glazed terracotta (not stoneware as sometimes said), with their bases made separately, and using a combination of moulded and freely formed "slab-constructed" sections. They use the difficult sancai three-colour glazing process (here in fact often including four colours), which requires two firings. This was widely used for vessels and figures found in Tang dynasty (618–907) tombs (this set in London is a good example), but from the mid-8th century is rarely found in most of China. However the regional Liao dynasty, founded by the semi-nomadic Khitan people, continued to use the style, although normally for vessels rather than figures, and Beijing and Yixian were on the southern edge of their state, with Beijing (as "Nanjing") their southern capital.

The figures, variously described as life-size or "slightly over life-size", are among the largest made with the technique and are agreed to be outstanding examples from the technical as well as the artistic point of view. According to one scholar "it would tax the best-equipped modern pottery to build up and fire such massive objects without sinkage or warping or loss of pose", though he was probably unaware that because of their exceptional size the figures have iron rods inserted internally before firing to support the structure, a very unusual element.

Because of their high quality it is often believed that they may have been made at one of the imperial kilns, which were home to the most highly skilled craftsmen. Remains of a kiln have been excavated since 1983 at Longquanwu (not Longquan), between Beijing and the findspot, which seems a plausible site for their manufacture, with fragments of figures with similar characteristics found Although Gillman was unconvinced by this suggestion in 2011, in 2013 he noted the promising correlation made by Nigel Wood and Chris Doherty between unusually high sodium oxide levels in Liao and Jin wares from Longquanwu and in the Hermitage and Boston figures, and therefore that the set could have been made at Longquanwu during the last active phase of the kiln.
