= Stanley K. Abe =

American art historian

- Occupation: Art historian

Academic background
- Education: University of California, Berkeley (BA, MA, PhD)

Stanley K. Abe is an American art historian with Duke University and a specialist in Chinese art and Buddhist art. He received his B.A., M.A., and Ph.D. from the University of California at Berkeley. His book Ordinary Images (2002) won the Freer Gallery/Smithsonian Institution: Shimada Prize. Additionally, he served as editor in chief of Archives of Asian Art from 2011 to 2018.

== Selected publications ==
- Stanley K. Abe (1990). Art and Practice in a Fifth-century Chinese Buddhist Cave Temple. Ars Orientalis. Vol. 20 – via Internet Archive.
- Ordinary images. University of Chicago Press, Chicago, 2002. ISBN 9780226000442
- A Freer stela reconsidered. Freer Gallery of Art and Arthur M. Sackler Gallery Occasional Paper, 2002.
- "To avoid the inscrutable: Abstract Expressionism and the "Oriental Mode"." In Discrepant Abstraction, Ed. K. Mercer, MIT Press, 2006. pp. 52–73. ISBN 026263337X
- Imagining Sculpture. Munich: Hirmer Publishers, 2022. ISBN 9783777437583
