= Kyeyul =

School of Korean Buddhism

Kyeyul (Korean: 계율종; Hanja: 戒律宗) was a Korean school. It was founded by Korean monk Kyŏmik who went to India in 526 CE to learn Sanskrit and study Vinaya. It is the Korean name applied to a branch of Buddhism that specializes in the study and implementation of śīla (yuljang 律藏) the "moral discipline" or ""Buddhist ethics". It derives directly from the Indian Vinaya School.

== History ==
When Buddhism first came to Baekje in 384, it was introduced by a Serindian monk named Marananta, Buddhism was quickly embraced but largely unknown.

Korean monk Kyŏmik (겸익, 謙益) was sent to India to bring back more information. He is said to have traveled to India via the southern seas, studied Sanskrit and the trepitaka vedatta at "Sangana Vinaya Temple".. He returned to Baekje accompanied by another Indian monk, Paedalta (Vedatta?) and with many texts on the Vinaya and Abhidharma.

He translated the text into a book called Yulmun in Korea, and carried the Sanskrit from India to Korea. The translated text and the Gyeyul monastic order were lost.

Vinaya monk Jajang (590–658 CE), born in Silla as a true bone (jin'gol) aristocrat, revived the Gyeyul order and built the Woljeongsa temple in 643 of Jogye Order of Korean Buddhism on the eastern slopes of Odaesan in Pyeongchang County. In 641 CE, Jajang and his disciple Seungsil travelled to Tang dynasty China where he received bone relic of Buddha's crown, Śarīra relics and an honorary robe. He also visited Yunju Temple where he stayed until his return to Silla in 643 CE.

== See also ==
- Silk Road transmission of Buddhism
- Buddhism in Korea
- Dhyānabhadra
- Jajang
- Jogye Order
- Marananta
- Sangha
- śīla
- Śarīra
- Tongdosa
- Vinaya
