= Oseam (disambiguation) =

Oseam refers to;

- Oseam, a Korean Buddhist temple
- Oseam (2003 film), a 2003 South Korean film
- Oseam (1990 film), a 1990 South Korean film
