= Odaesan =

Mountain in South Korea

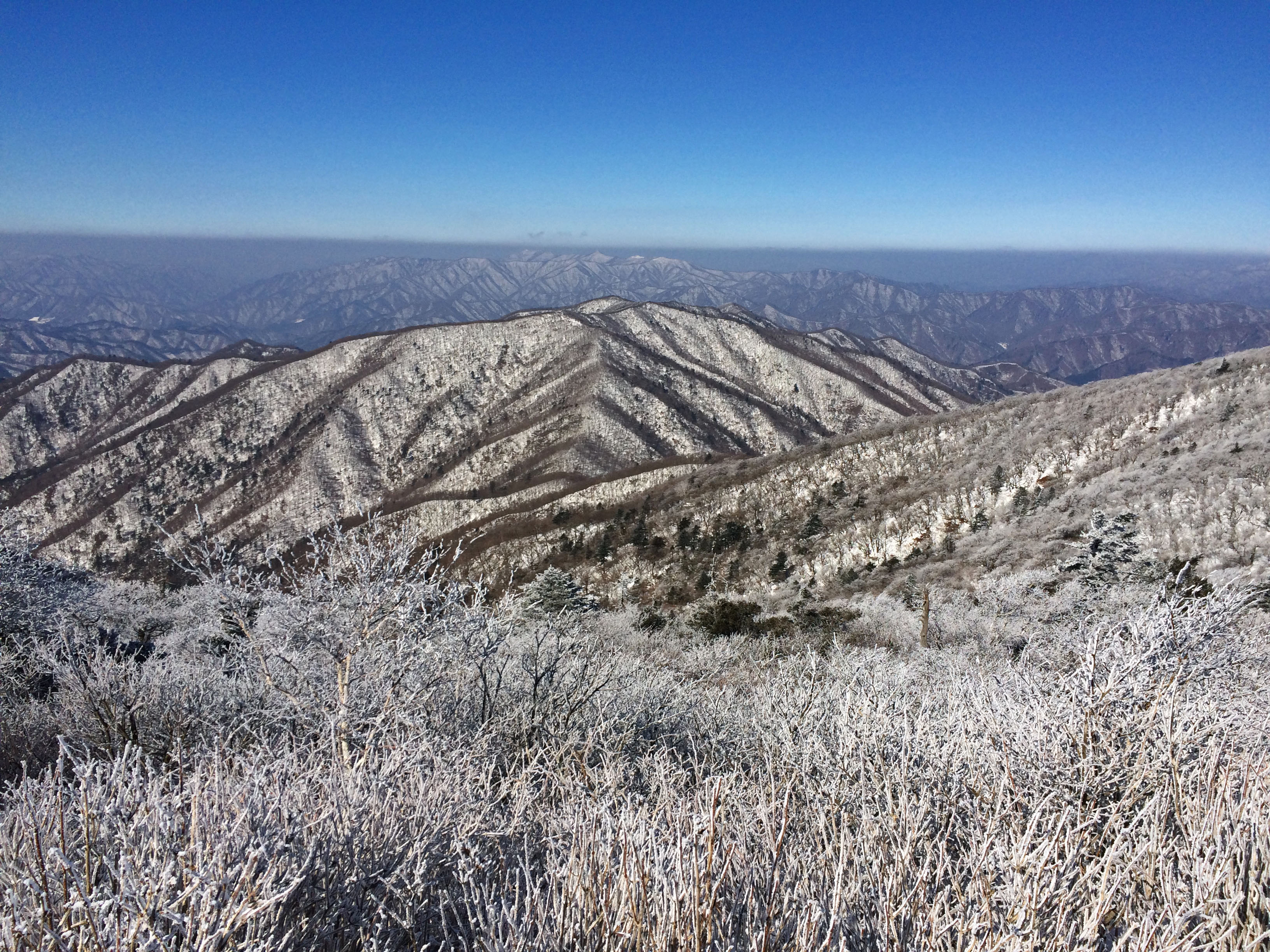
- Photo taken from Birobong Peak (2017)

Highest point
- Elevation: 1,563 m (5,128 ft)
- Coordinates: 37°47′53″N 128°32′35″E

Geography
- Location: South Korea
- Parent range: Taebaek Mountains

Korean name
- Hangul: 오대산
- Hanja: 五臺山
- RR: Odaesan
- MR: Odaesan

Odaesan, also known as Mount Odae-san or Mount Odae (Korean: 오대산; Hanja: 五臺山), is a major cluster of mountains and national park in eastern Gangwon Province, South Korea, standing at the junction of Gangneung City, Pyeongchang County and Hongcheon County. It stands at the junction of the Taebaek Mountains and the Charyeong Mountains, a spur range stretching to the west and serving to divide the South Han River / Namhan River from the North Han River / Bukhan River. It stands just to the south of Seoraksan and north of Dutasan along the Baekdu-daegan Mountain-system mainline, the range of granite peaks that make up the symbolic spine of the Korean Peninsula, but its peaks are more rounded and forested than most. National Highway 6 runs through the park, between the south main-entrance and the northeast corner descending to the east coast. It contain five main peaks surrounding a deep main valley running north to south, and several other subsidiary peaks, such as Noin-bong (see Attractions below), with gorges between, a watershed forming a river leaving this area to the south. Just outside the western boundary of the national park area, another mountain Gyebangsan rises to 1,577 m (5,174 ft), higher than conventional Odae-san's summit, and they are connected by a 10 km long ridge; it is controversial whether or not to include this within the cluster or consider it as separate.

The Odaesan mountains are a famous site for tourism and the practice of, and pilgrimage for, Korean Buddhism. The five main peaks were the reason for granting its name 五臺山 or "Five Platforms Mountains" (or terraces, cliff-tops; a "platform" being the base-table on which a Buddha statue sits, and on which a master sits upon to give formal lectures. These five lofty peaks are conceived of as five base-tables on which each of the five most important cosmic Buddhas of Mahayana Buddhism sit, teaching the world). This name was borrowed from China's famous Wutaishan. The peaks were named after the Buddha who was believed to have sat on them, and also by their relative positions according to the Chinese "Five Directions" (a factor of the Wuxing (Chinese philosophy) system). The highest summit, with elevation of 1,563 m (5,128 ft), is named Biro-bong (Korean: 비로봉; Hanja: 毘盧峰) "Vairocana Peak", and also Jungdae-bong (Korean: 중대봉; Hanja: 中臺峰) "Central Platform Peak". There are then also the South, North, West and East Platform Peaks, each having their own designated Buddha and with hermitages on their slopes dedicated to particular Bodhisattvas.

== History ==
Odae-san has been a highly sacred mountain-cluster of Korean Buddhism ever since Master Jajang founded Woljeongsa Temple in its main valley and interred purported relics of Sakyamuni Gautama Buddha halfway up the southern slope of the Biro-bong Summit in 643 CE, after determining that it was geographically similar to China's Wutaishan and therefore also a doryang "residence" for Manjushri the Bodhisattva of Wisdom (Munsu-bosal in Korean). This was a result of his having visited Wutai-shan on Pilgrimage, and having had a revelation-vision of that deity in which he was told that he could find such a set of five peaks in his nation and would experience the Bodhisattva also living there.

One of the four mountain-based (for protection) royal archive buildings of the Joseon is located near the center of the Odae-san cluster, just north of Woljeong-sa, reconstructed near the end of 20th century. It was founded in 1606 to house the Annals of the Joseon Dynasty and Uigwe or "Royal Protocols of the Joseon Dynasty". This is the only one of those archive buildings that was not burned during the Japanese invasions of Korea. This site for the archives within Odae-san was traditionally thought to be able to withstand fire, wind and water. In 1922 during the Korea under Japanese rule, many volumes and other relics from this archive were transferred to the Tokyo Imperial University, now the University of Tokyo, and later stored at the Imperial Household Agency. Some of them were lost in the Great Kanto earthquake of 1927. In August 2010, the Japanese Prime Minister Naoto Kan announced the return of the remaining volumes and relics, to mark the centenary of the Japanese annexation of Korea. This was followed by the return of 1,200 volumes, including 150 from the Uigwe, in December 2011. They were received with great ceremony and subsequently exhibited at the National Palace Museum of Korea and then stored in the Gyujanggak Library of Seoul National University.

In 1964, Iris odaesanensis was first discovered on the mountain and then named after the mountain.

In a remote part of Odae-san, three peat high-moor fens (a rarity in Korea) in an area of just 2300 m^{2} were designated as the Odaesan National Park Wetlands under the international Ramsar Convention, on October 13, 2008. This area remains closed to the public due to ecological delicacy.

== Attractions ==
The central areas of the Odae-san mountain-cluster are preserved as the Odaesan National Park, famous for hiking, tourism, pilgrimage and public recreation, especially in October when the leaves of its many deciduous trees turn red, gold and yellow. It contains two of Korea's most prominent Buddhist monasteries, Woljeongsa in the south of the main valley (at the entrance to the park)) and Sangwonsa at its northern terminus, as well as a half-dozen major hermitages (subsidiary temples), all members the Jogye Order of Korean Buddhism.

The temples host a variety of Korean cultural treasures, including four National Treasures: the Bronze Dharma Bell (NT#36), the Wooden Seated Child Manjusri Statue (NT#221), the Documents (NT#292) of Sangwon-sa, and the Octagonal Nine-story stone Pagoda with Stone Manjusri Statue (NT#48) of Woljeong-sa. There are also many designated Treasures and Provincial Cultural Heritage Items, with many on display at the museum at Woljeong-sa Temple. The most prominent hermitages are Saja-am, Gwaneum-am, Mireuk-am, Yeombul-am, Jijang-am, and Sujeong-am.

It is said that there are no steep or high mountainsides in Mt. Odae, and so there is no risk of avalanche even if the snow is heavy in winter. The northeast arm of the national park begins at Noinbong (노인봉; 老人峰) "Elderly Person [Grandfather] Peak"), and soars 1,338 m (4,390 ft) above Highway 6. From Noinbong flows the long, beautiful waterfall-gorge Sogeumgang Valley (소금강계곡; 小金剛溪谷) or "Minor Diamond Scenic-Gorge" to the northeast until exiting at the northern tip of Gangneung City. Sogeumgang Valley is compared to a beautiful sector of the famous Mount Kumgang (Geumgang-san) or "Diamond Mountains" of North Korea. It includes the Guryong Falls or "Nine Dragons Waterfalls", and the Cheonghak-dong or "Azure-Cranes Village" area of high, steep cliffs. This rocky gorge is renowned for its captivating natural features and is a favorite for hikers. Legend tells that "Yulgok" Yi I granted its name in the 1500s. In the center resides a small Buddhist temple named Geumgang-sa or "Diamond Temple".

== See also ==
- Odaesan National Park Wetlands
- Wutai Shan, a Chinese mountain of the same name
- Baekdudaegan
- List of mountains in Korea
