= Jajang =

Korean Buddhist monk (590–658)

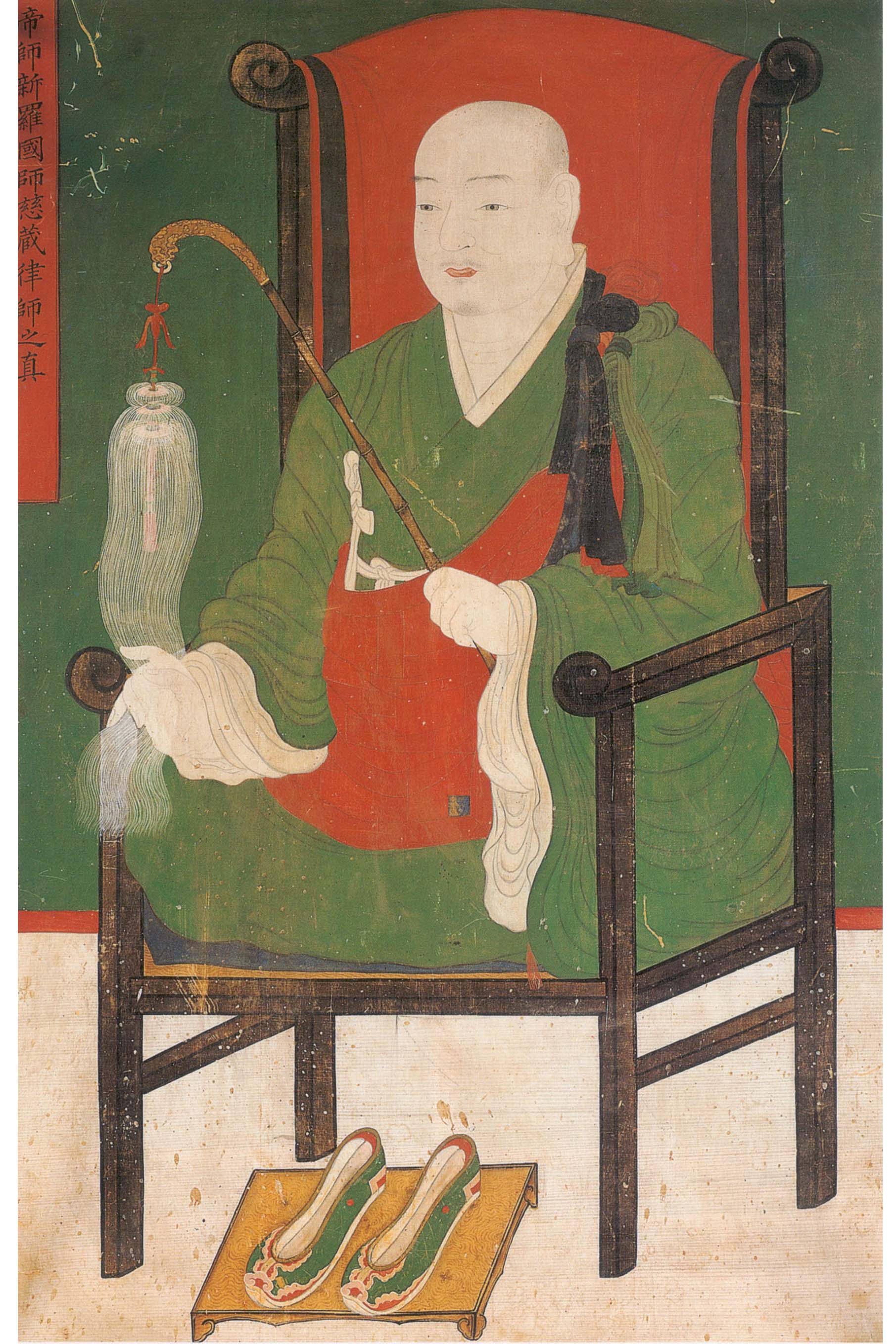
- Painting of Jajang (artist unknown)

Korean name
- Hangul: 김선종
- Hanja: 金善宗
- RR: Gim Seonjong
- MR: Kim Sŏnjong

Dharma name
- Hangul: 자장 율사
- Hanja: 慈藏律師
- RR: Jajang yulsa
- MR: Chajang yulsa

Jajang (590–658) was a monk born Kim Seonjong, into the royal Kim family, in the kingdom of Silla. He is credited with founding the temple of Tongdosa in 646 CE, near in what is now Busan, South Korea, and played a significant role in the adoption of Buddhism as the national religion of Silla. His biography is told in the anthology of Korean Buddhism: "Jogye Culture Web", Vol 10.

Gyeyul (Korean: 계율종; Hanja: 戒律宗; MR: Kyeyuljong) and Yuljong 律宗, or Vinaya in Sanskrit) monastic order, founded by Gyeomik for the study and implementation of śīla (yuljang 律藏) the "moral discipline" or ""Budhhist ethics"), was lost after the decline of Baekje. After him, Jajang revived the Gyeyul order and built the Woljeongsa temple in 643 of Jogye Order of Korean Buddhism on the eastern slopes of Odaesan in today Pyeongchang County. Jajang was born in Silla as a true bone (jin'gol) aristocrat. In 641 CE, Jajang and his disciple Seungsil traveled to Tang dynasty China where he received bone relic of Buddha's crown, Śarīra relics and an honorary robe. He also visited Yunju Temple where he stayed until his return to Silla in 643 CE.

== Training ==
In 636 Jajang traveled to China to study under the great Buddhist masters of the Tang dynasty China, for seven years becoming a taeguksa (Great Noble Priest) upon returning, receiving the highest honors from Queen Seondeok.

== Treasures ==
When Jajang returned from China he was given invaluable holy treasures: a fragment of the original Sakyamuni Buddha's skull, a wooden begging-bowl and monastic-robe of Buddha, and 100 of the Buddha's "sarira" (pearl or crystal-like bead-shaped objects that are purportedly found among the cremated ashes of Buddhist spiritual masters).

== Reputation ==
Because of his astute mind, he was repeatedly requested by the King to take a position of responsibility at court. Jajang repeatedly refused these requests, so finally the exasperated King issued an ultimatum: "If you do not accept this official position I offer, I will have your head severed for disobedience." Jajang replied, "I would rather die keeping the commandments of Buddha for one day than live for a hundred years while breaking them." The King saw the wisdom in Jajang's reply and relented allowing Jajang to remain a monk.

== Temples ==
Jajang established many temples but Tongdosa, one of the Three Jewel Temples of Korea, is considered the most important.

Temples of note:

- Magoksa in 640 or 642
- Bongjeongam (Phoenix Bower Hermitage) in 642
- Sangwonsa in 643
- Oseam in 643
- Woljeongsa in 643
- Tongdosa in 646.
- Sinheungsa in 652
- Manggyeongsa Temple in Taebaek on the Taebaek Mountains

== See also ==
- Silk Road transmission of Buddhism
- Buddhism in Korea
- Hinduism in Korea
- Jogye Order
- Gyeomik
- Gyeyul
- Sangha
- Śarīra
- śīla
- Tongdosa
- Vinaya
