= Guryong Falls =

Waterfalls in South Korea

Guryong Falls (Korean: 구룡폭포; lit. 'Nine Dragon Falls') is a group of nine waterfalls of Sogeumgang River (소금강) in Odaesan National Park in South Korea.
