= Three Jewels Temples =

Buddhist temples in South Korea

- Hangul: 삼보사찰
- Hanja: 三寶寺刹
- RR: Sambo sachal
- MR: Sambo sach'al

The Three Jewels Temples (Korean: 삼보사찰; Hanja: 三寶寺刹) are the three principal Buddhist temples in Korea, each representing one of the Three Jewels of Buddhism. The three temples are Tongdosa, Haeinsa, and Songgwangsa which represent Buddha, dharma (Buddhist teachings) and sangha (Buddhist community) respectively. The term was made in mid Joseon.

Tongdosa represents Buddha because it houses sarira of Buddha. In the mid 7th century, Jajang, a Silla monk, brought sarira to Korea. He divided it into three and placed each in Tongdosa, Hwangnyongsa, and Taehwasa respectively.

Haeinsa represents dharma because it houses the Tripitaka Koreana.

Songgwangsa is the root of Jeonghye Gyeolsa (정혜결사; 定慧結社), a society Jinul established in mid Goryeo to correct the corruption of Buddhism. It represents sangha because it produced 16 guksa (national monk) until early Joseon.

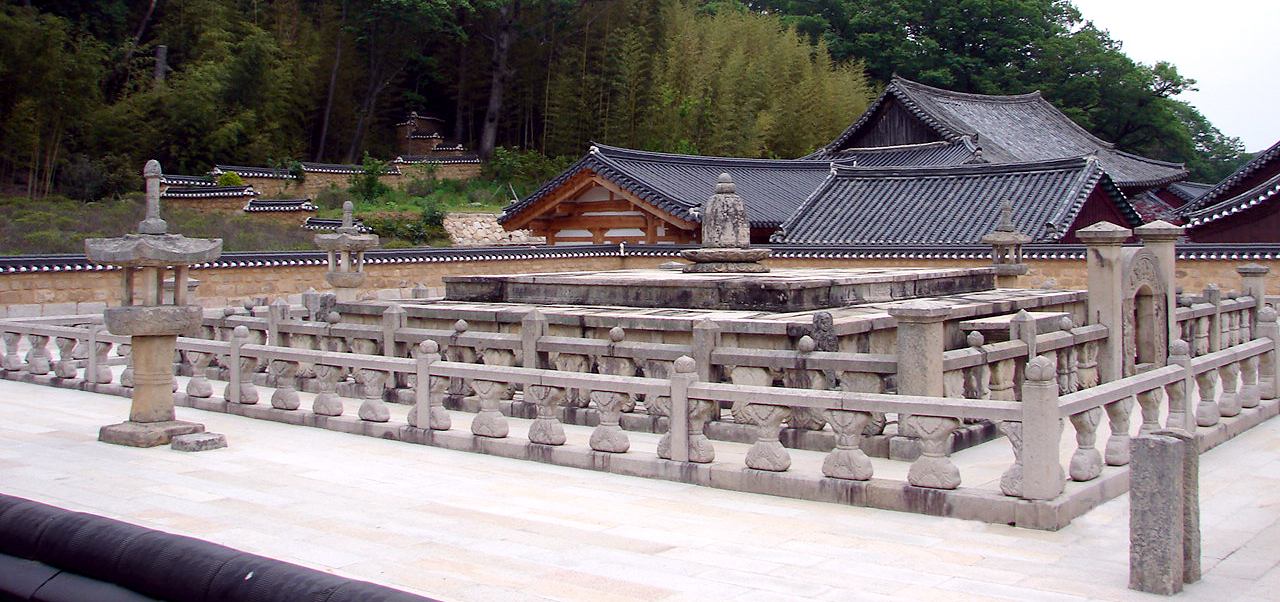
Tongdosa

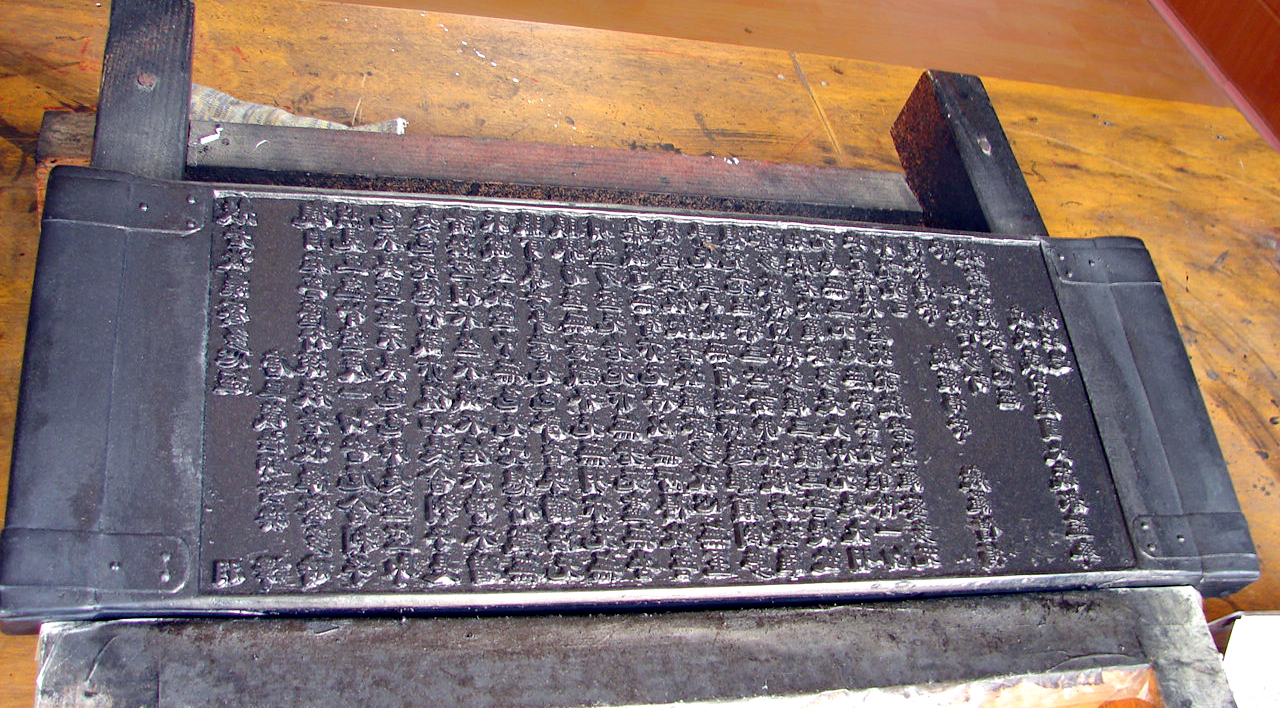
Haeinsa

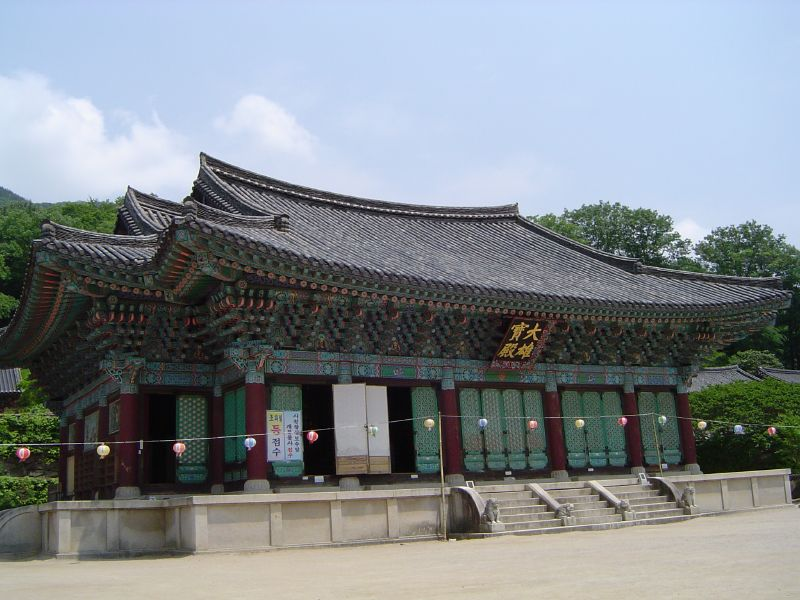
Songgwangsa

Three Jewels Temples

== See also ==
- Buddhist temples in Korea
