= Oseam =

Korean Buddhist temple in South Korea

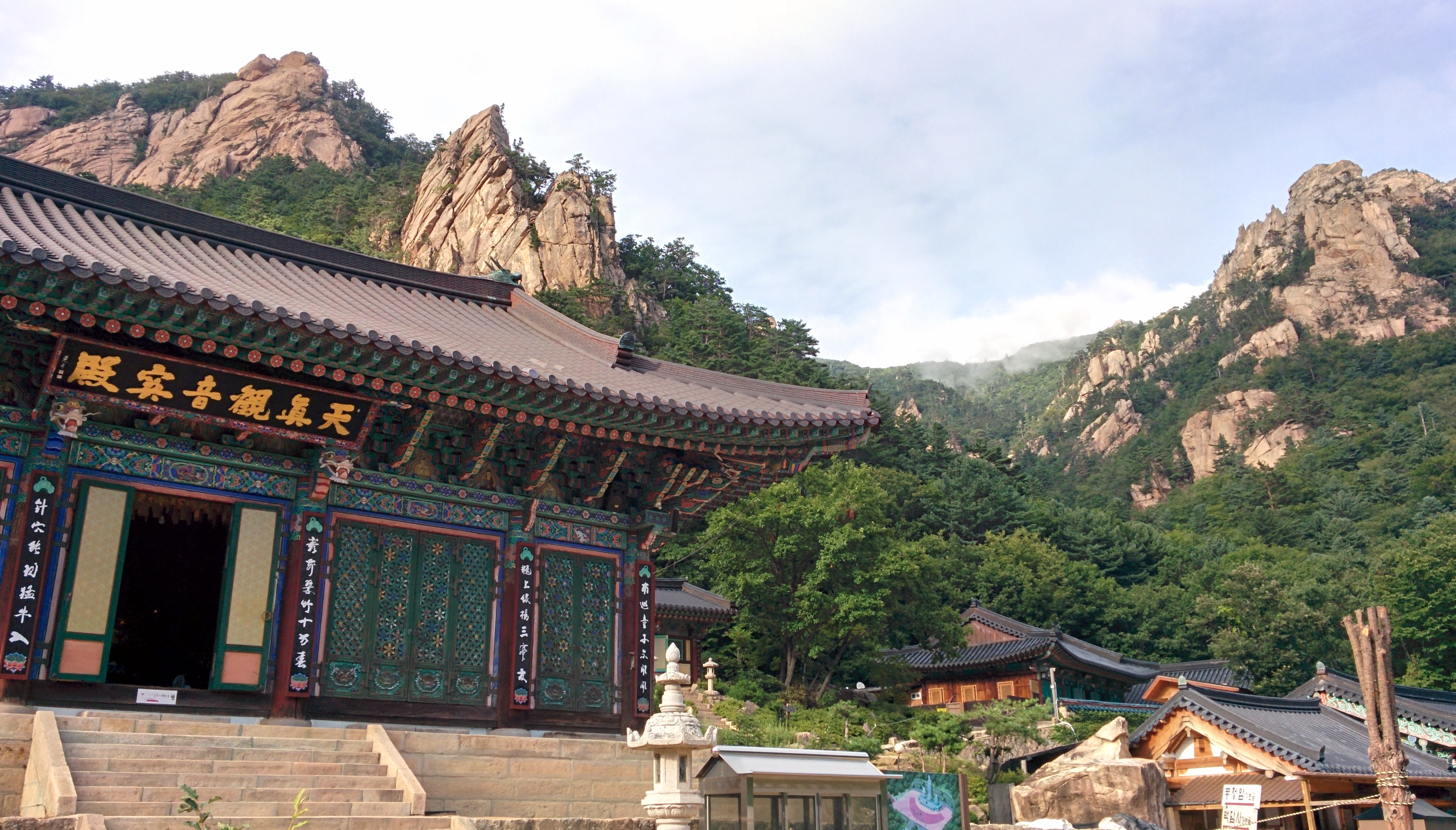
- Oseam and surrounding peaks (2018)

Religion
- Affiliation: Buddhism

Location
- State: Gangwon Province
- Country: South Korea
- Interactive map of Oseam
- Coordinates: 38°12′N 128°24′E

Architecture
- Completed: 643

Korean name
- Hangul: 오세암
- Hanja: 五歲庵
- RR: Oseam
- MR: Oseam

Oseam or Oseam Temple is a small Korean Buddhist temple located in the area of Mangyeongdae Pavilion, Seoraksan, Gangwon Province, South Korea. It is an annex of Baekdamsa Temple which is the head temple of the third district in the Jogye Order.

Oseam was first established as Gwaneumam (觀音庵) by Monk Jajang in 643, the 12th year of Queen Seondeok's reign during the Silla Kingdom and Monk Bou (普雨) reconstructed the temple in 1548 during the King Myeongjong of the Joseon Dynasty. The temple name was changed to Oseam after Monk Seoljeong (雪淨) rebuilt it in 1643 during the King Injo's reign. A famous tale regarding Monk Seoljeong and the name has been handed down.

== The origin of a name ==
Seoljeong was raising his orphaned brother's son at the temple, but he left for Yangyang to prepare for the winter. He left the temple after cooking meals for his four-year-old nephew, who would be alone for a few days. It had snowed all night after the market had started. When he came back in March next year, he found a child who was believed to have died, hanging a wooden tablet and calling for the Avalokitesvara. It is said that a five-year-old boy called the Gwaneum Rock " Five Years Rock " to tell the tale of the superhuman strength of Avalokitesvara.

== In popular culture ==
Korean film oseam is based on a myth associated with the temple.

== See also ==
- Buddhism in Korea
- Korean Buddhist temples
