= Marananta =

Buddhist monk and missionary

- Hangul: 마라난타
- Hanja: 摩羅難陀
- Revised Romanization: Marananta
- McCune–Reischauer: Maranant'a

Malananta (fl. late 4th century) was an Indian Buddhist monk and missionary who brought Buddhism to the southern Korean peninsula in the 4th century. Multiple romanizations of Malananta's name may be found, including Meghananda (मेघानंदा), Malananda, Maranant'a and Maalaananda. He was among the first to bring Buddhist teaching, or Dharma, to Korea. The Samguk yusa and Samguk yusa record him as the one who brought Buddhism to King Chimnyu of Baekje in 384 CE, along with Sundo in Goguryeo and Ado in Silla. Buddhism, a religion originating in what is now India, was transmitted to Korea via China in the late 4th century.

== Name ==
Multiple romanizations of Mālānanda's name may be found, including Marananta, Maranant'a and Maalaananda. An alternative reconstruction of his name is Kumāranandin.

== History ==
Marananta was born in India. Marananta had previously been connected with the region of Gandhara due to a translation error interpreting the word "Zhuqian" to mean "Gandhara of India" when it simply means "India". The connection between Marananta and Gandhara has been described as an "absurd mistake". He was among the first to bring Buddhism to the Korean Peninsula. The Samgungnyusa records him as the one who brought Buddhism to Baekje, along with Sundo in Goguryeo and Ado in Silla.

Mālānanda came to Baekje from Jin China in the ninth lunar month of 384, the coronation year of Chimnyu of Baekje. Two months before Mālānanda's arrival, King Chimnyu had sent a tribute mission to the Jin Empire, as was common upon the ascension of Baekje kings in this period. It is possible he was part of an official emissary from Jin China.

There are only scant mentions of Marananta in historical records.

== See also ==
- Buddhism in Korea
- Buddhism in East Asia
- Buddhism and Eastern religions
- Gyeomik, went to India to study the Vinaya, then founded the Vinaya School in Korea.
- Hyecho, Korean monk from Silla who traveled to India.
- Dhyānabhadra, Indian monk and translator who went to teach in Korea during Goryeo dynasty.
- Memorial of Heo Hwang-ok, Ayodhya
- Silk Road transmission of Buddhism
- Wang ocheonchukguk jeon
