= Odaesan National Park Wetlands =

National park in South Korea

- Odaesan National Park Wetlands (South Korea)
- Location: South Korea
- Coordinates: 37.77°N 128.67°E

Ramsar Wetland
- Designated: 13 October 2008
- Reference no.: 1848

Odaesan (also known as Mt. Odae) is located in the Taebaek Mountains, the longest mountain range in Korea. It is named Odaesan because it has five big mountain peaks (O means "five" in Korean). Odaesan National Park Wetlands has an area of 1.7 hectares and consists of three small fens: Jilmoeneup, Sohwangbyeongsanneup, and Jogaedongneup. This site was registered as a Ramsar Wetlands on October 13, 2008, at the 10th Ramsar Convention.

== Characteristics ==
Odaesan rises 1563 m above sea level, and all three swamps are high moors. Jilmoeneup is 1060 m above sea level, and is formed of peat deposits. Nearby Nilmoenuep, there is an artificial pasture that was built in 1972. It is a habitat of 28 Mammalia, 103 birds, 1900 insects, 13 Amphibia and 12 reptiles species, including many national endangered species. Sohwangbyeongsanneup is 1170 m above sea level, and is retained in its original, natural form. Jogaedongneup is 600 m above sea level and is also formed of peat deposits overall.

== Public conservation movements ==
Jilmoeneup and Sohwangbyeongsanneup were designated as National Park Special Protected Areas on January 17, 2008 and monitored by the government. Jilmoeneup also has preservation equipments set up. All three wetlands at Odaesan National Park Wetlands are off-limits places, thus public access is not allowed.

== Organisms ==
Animals

- Eurasian otter (Lutra lutra)
- Long-tailed goral (Naemorhedus caudatus)
- Golden eagle (Aquila chrysaeto)
- Korean ratsnake (Elaphe schrenckii)
- Callipogon relictus beetle
