= Woljeongsa =

Buddhist temple in Pyeongchang, South Korea

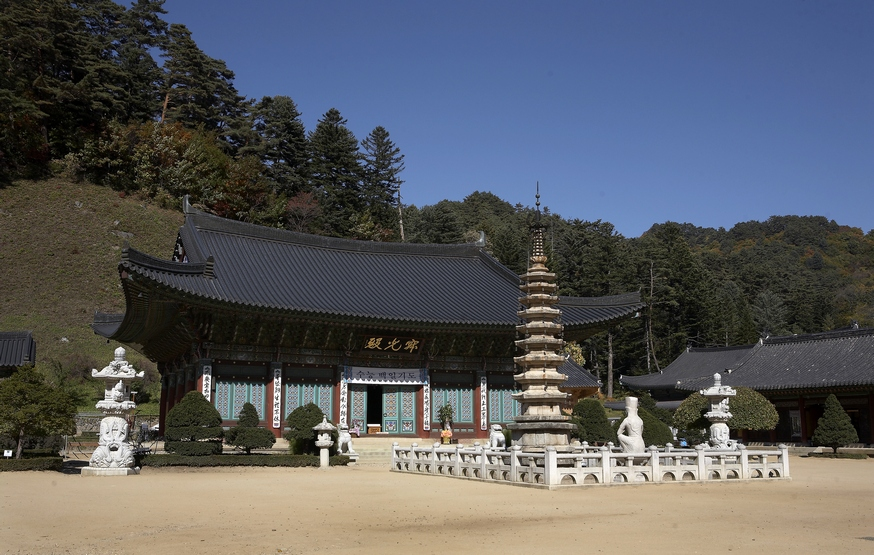
- Woljeongsa in 2008

- Location within South Korea

Religion
- Affiliation: Jogye Order of Korean Buddhism
- Deity: Manjushri

Location
- Location: 374-8, Odaesan-ro, Jinbu-myeon, Pyeongchang-gun, Gangwon-do
- Country: South Korea
- Coordinates: 37°43′53.7″N 128°35′33.2″E

Architecture
- Founder: Jajang
- Completed: 643

Korean name
- Hangul: 월정사
- Hanja: 月精寺
- RR: Woljeongsa
- MR: Wŏlchŏngsa

Woljeongsa (Korean: 월정사; Hanja: 月精寺) is a Buddhist temple located on the slopes of Odaesan mountain in Pyeongchang County, Gangwon Province, South Korea. It was founded in 643 by the Silla monk Jajang. It was destroyed during the Korean War and rebuilt in the 1960s. It is the head temple of the 4th parish of the Jogye Order and considered a holy site of Manjushri. It houses the National Treasures Octagonal Nine-Story Stone Pagoda and Stone Seated Bodhisattva.

== History ==
Woljeongsa was established by Jajang Yulsa in 643 (12th year of Queen Seondeok's reign). The name "Woljeong" was given because the full moon rising on Dongdaesan Mountain was exceptionally bright. After going to China and meeting Manjushri, Jajang returned to Silla with sarira. He stayed in a temporary hut to meet the manifestation of Manjushri but was not successful because inclement weather lasted for three days.

Later, Sinhyo Geosa, a monk known to be the reincarnation of Learned-Youth Bodhisattva (유동보살), resided there. Ven. Sinui, a disciple of Beomil Guksa (national preceptor), built a small hut on the site where Jajang Yulsa had built his and also resided there. After Sinui died, the hut fell into ruin. When Ven. Yuyeon of Sudasa built a hermitage on this site, it finally gained stature as a proper temple.

In 1307, the temple burnt to the ground and Ven. I-il rebuilt it. In 1833, it burnt down again and Ven. Yeongdam and Jeong-am rebuilt it in 1844. In the Joseon dynasty, it was responsible for protecting the Odaesansago National History Archives.

=== Modern era ===
During the Korean War, generals Walton Walker and Kim Baek-il ordered the temple to be burnt down for strategic purposes. After Ven. Tanheo reconstructed jeokgwangjeon (building enshrining Vairocana) in 1964, Ven. Manhwa continued the reconstruction.

The Seongbo Museum opened in 1999 to manage the cultural properties of 60 temples belonging to the 4th parish of the Jogye Order.

In 1922, the Japanese colonial authorities transferred Uigwe (Royal Protocols of Joseon) to Japan's Imperial Household Agency. In 2006, Woljeongsa filed a lawsuit against the Japanese government to demand its return, and it was repatriated to the National Palace Museum of Korea in 2011. Woljeongsa launched a campaign to return it to its original place and in 2023, Uigwe was returned to Odaesan.

== Cultural properties ==
Woljeongsa has many cultural properties. Representative cultural properties are the National Treasures Stone Seated Bodhisattva and Octagonal Nine-Story Stone Pagoda.

=== Octagonal Nine-Story Stone Pagoda ===
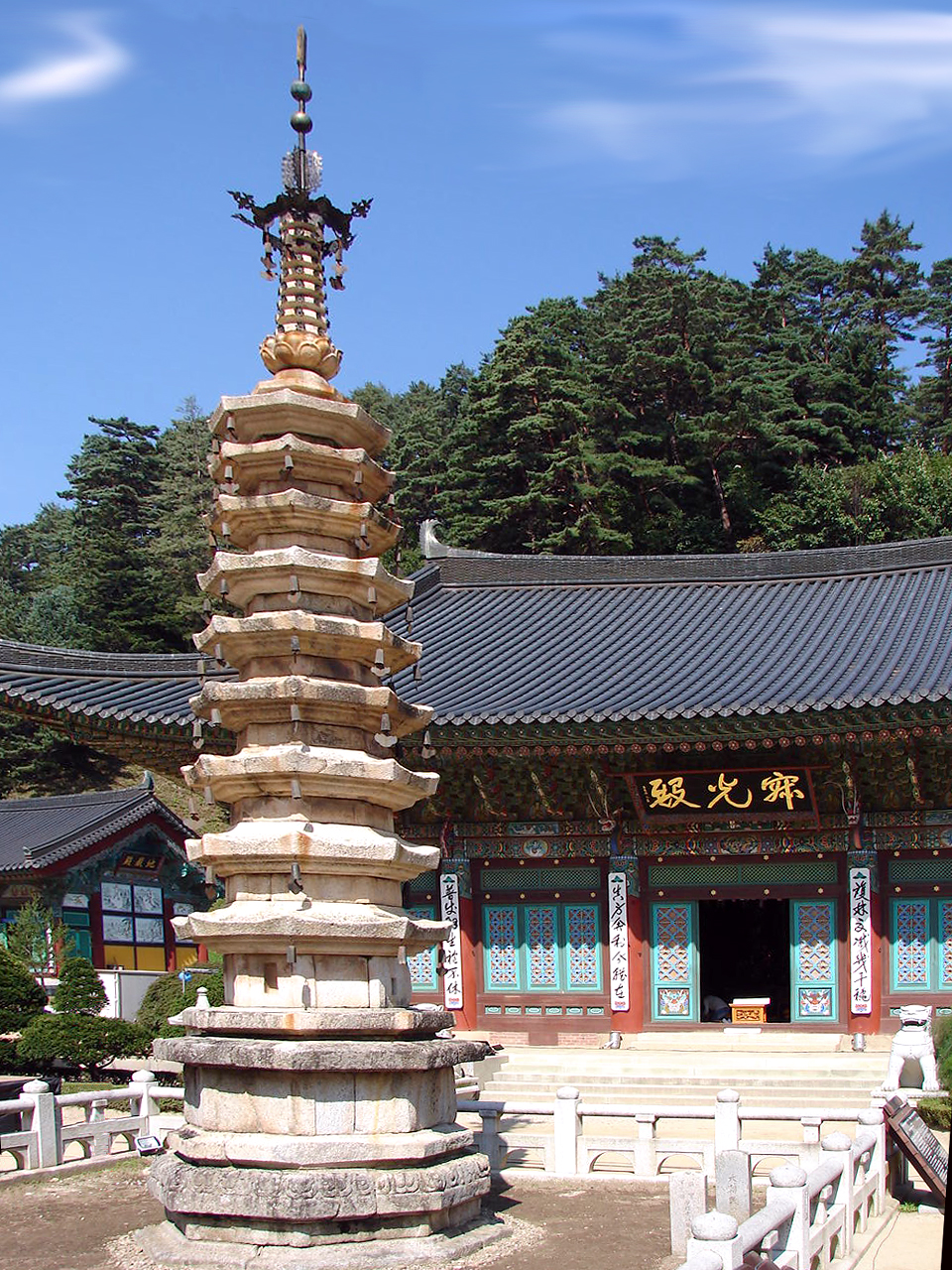
Octagonal Nine-Story Stone Pagoda

The Octagonal Nine-Story Stone Pagoda, constructed in the 12th century, is a polygonal stone pagoda standing 15 meters high. It was designated as a National Treasure in 1962 because it is representative of the multi-storied pagodas popular during the early Goryeo period, especially in the northern regions.

Relics were discovered inside the pagoda in 1970 when the pagoda was dismantled and restored. Total 12 pieces of 9 types (e.g. silver-gilt standing Buddha statue), most of them were made in the 10th and 11th century. They were designated as Treasure in 2003 because of their importance in studying the metal craft of early Goryeo.

=== Stone Seated Bodhisattva ===
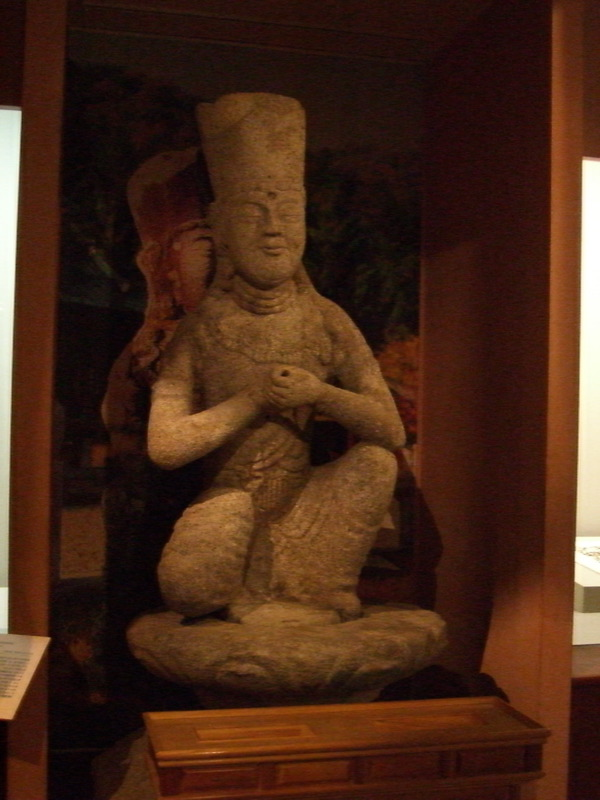
Stone Seated Bodhisattva

In front of the Octagonal Nine-Story Stone Pagoda, there is a 1.8 meter statue of a Bodhisattva, probably Medicine Buddha, made in the 11th century. Said to have been found in the Diamond Pond to the south of the temple, the statue is offering to an unknown figure. The statue currently in front of the pagoda is a 2008 replica and the original is stored in the Seongbo Museum.

Bodhisattva statues in front of pagodas are characteristic of the early Goryeo period and not found in other countries. Also, they are usually found in Gangwon Province, which is important for the study of regional Goryeo Buddhist sculptures. Thus, it was promoted to National Treasure in 2017 after being designated as Treasure no. 139.

=== Select list of cultural properties in Woljeongsa & Seongbo Museum ===
National Treasures

- Octagonal Nine-Story Stone Pagoda of Woljeongsa Temple
- Stone Seated Bodhisattva of Woljeongsa Temple
- Documents of Sangwonsa Temple: Oldest book in Hangeul

Treasures

- Excavated Relics from the Wooden Seated Child Manjusri of Sangwonsa Temple: Balwonmun (writing making a wish to Buddha) shows when various Buddha statues were created.
- Reliquaries from the Octagonal Nine-story Stone Pagoda of Woljeongsa Temple
- Excavated Documents from Wooden Seated Manjusri Bodhisattva of Sangwonsa Temple: Printed in late Goryeo/early Joseon, it is important for studying Buddhist history and bibliography.

National Folklore Cultural Heritage

- Woman’s Ornamental Jacket Worn During the Reign of King Sejo: Worn in the 1460s, it is the oldest jeogori in Korea.

National Registered Cultural Heritage

- Outer Vestment Worn by Monk Hanam has historical, cultural and religious value.

Gangwon Tangible Cultural Heritage

- Statue of 6-hands Avalokitesvara in Woljeongsa Temple: Bodhisattva statue of Joseon Dynasty with beauty of balance
- Tripitaka Koreana: Printed in 1865 (2nd year of King Gojong's reign)
- Wooden Seated Statue of Buddha and Excavated Relics in Gounam, North Hermitage in Woljeongsa Temple

Gangwon Cultural Heritage Material

- Milbu of Woljeongsa Temple: First case of milbu (list given to deal with emergency at any time and place) the king gave to a temple in Gangwon Province
- Documents on Odaesansago History Archives: Rare historical source on management of Odaesansago in the mid-19th century

Gangwon Intangible Cultural Heritage

- Woljeongsa tapdori (circling the pagoda)

== Facilities ==
- Woljeongsa consists of the following buildings: iljumun, sacheonwangmun, jeokgwangjeon, sugwangjeon (building enshrining Amitābha), samseonggak, and buildings for Templestay.
- There is a fir forest around the temple, which won the top prize at the 12th Beautiful Forest Contest held by Korea Forest Service.

== Gallery ==
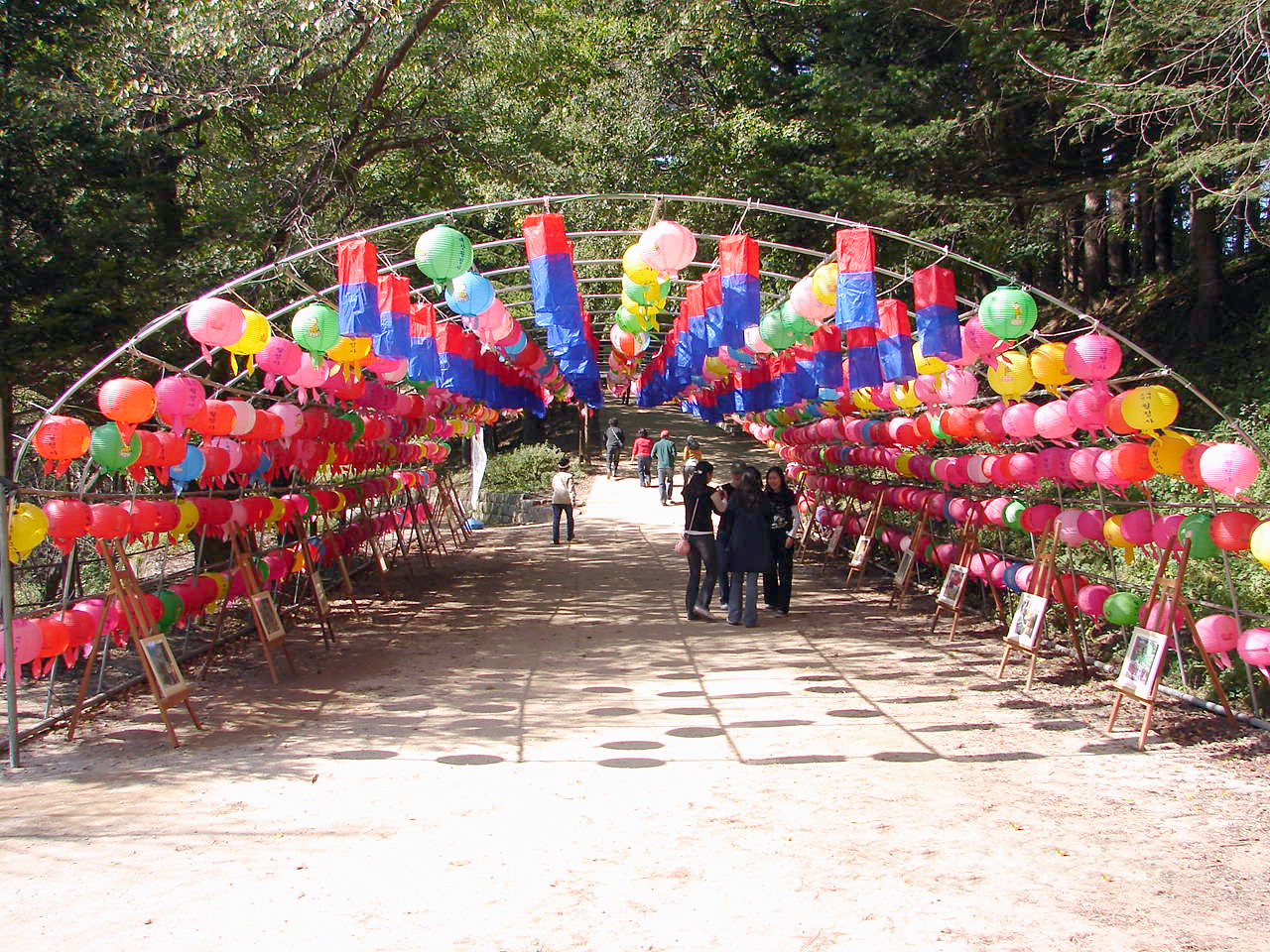
Tunnel of lanterns at Woljeongsa's entrance

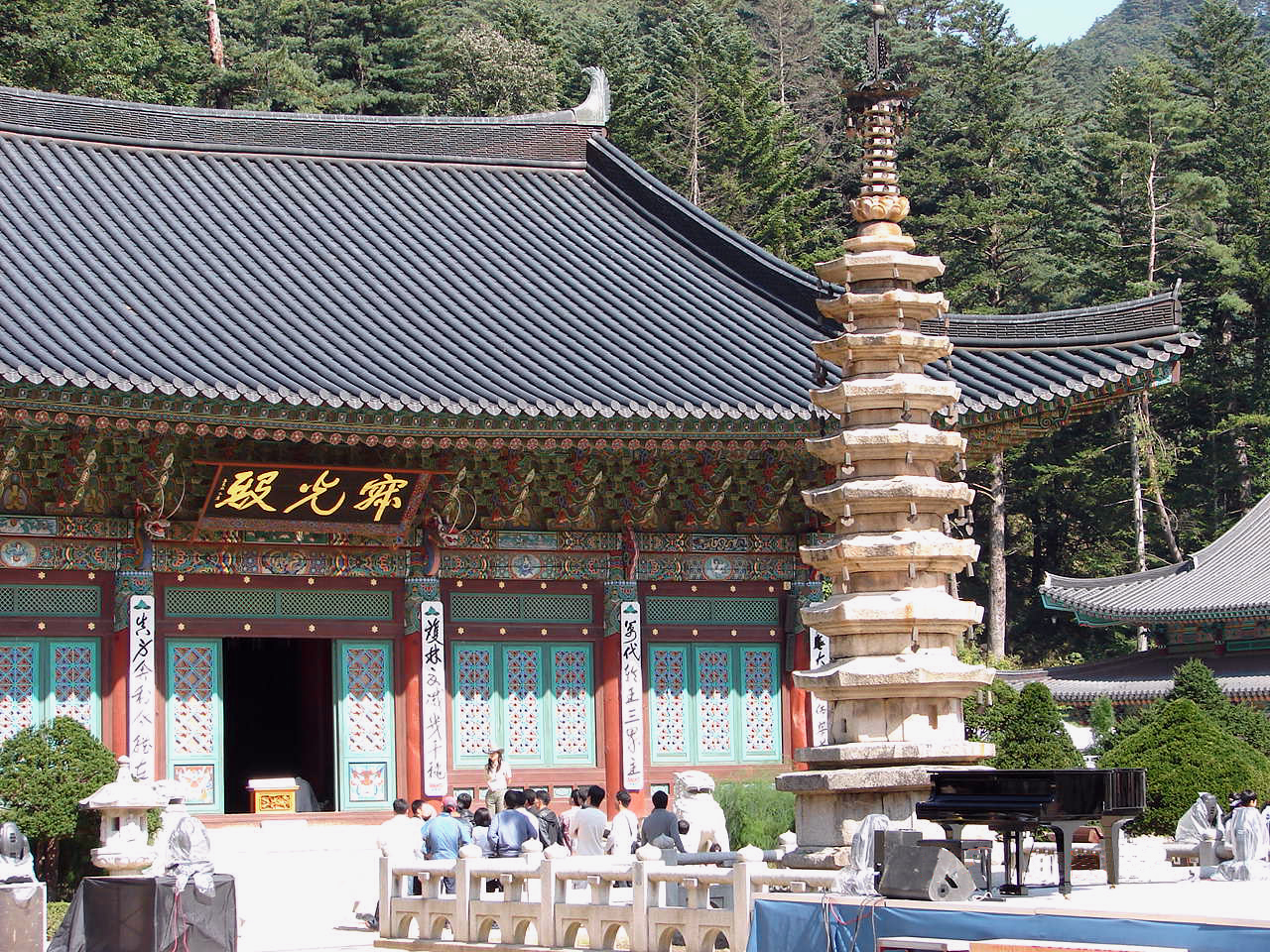
Woljeongsa's Octagonal Nine Story Stone Pagoda stands in front of the main worship hall

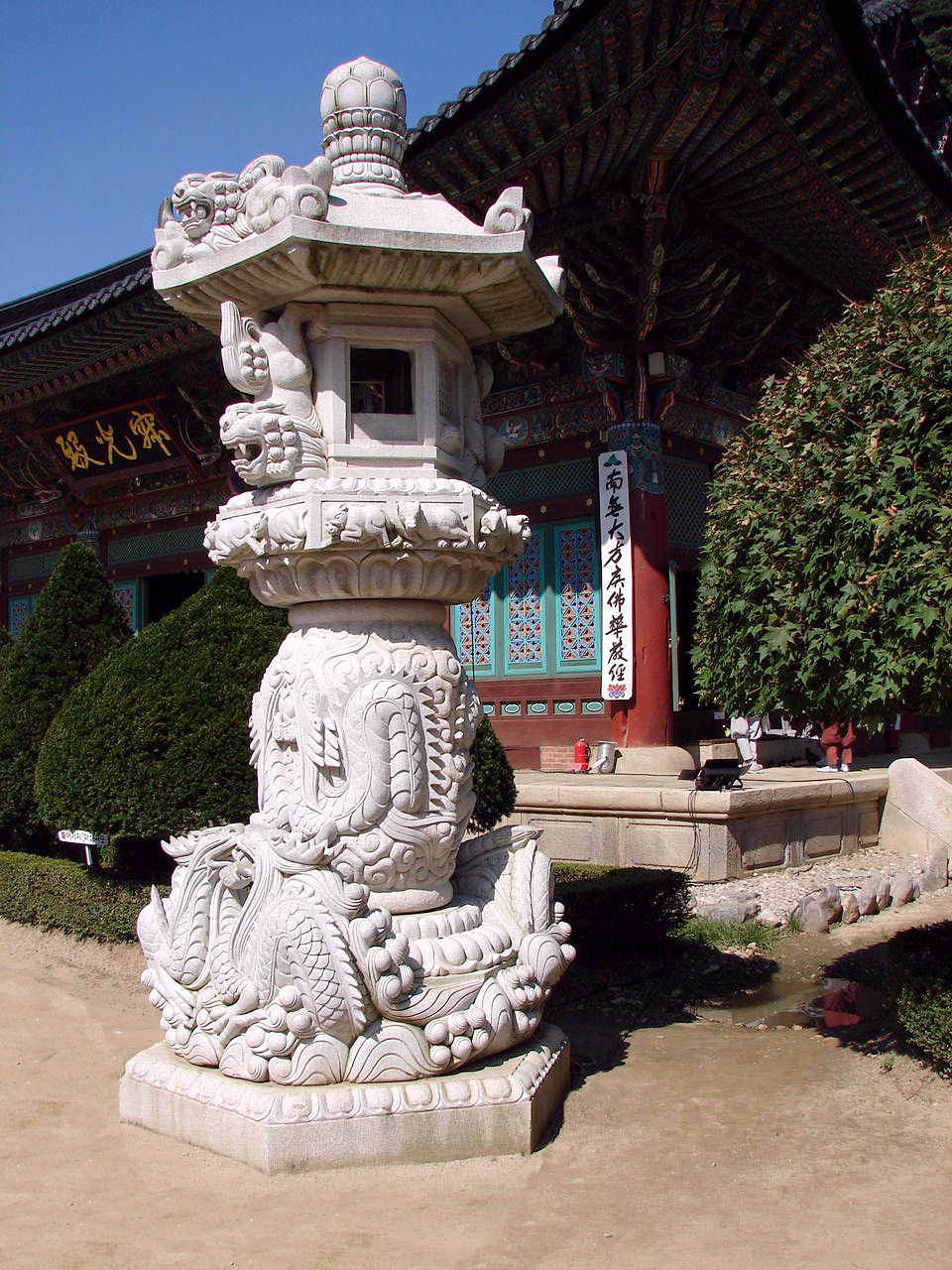
Stone Lantern at Woljeongsa

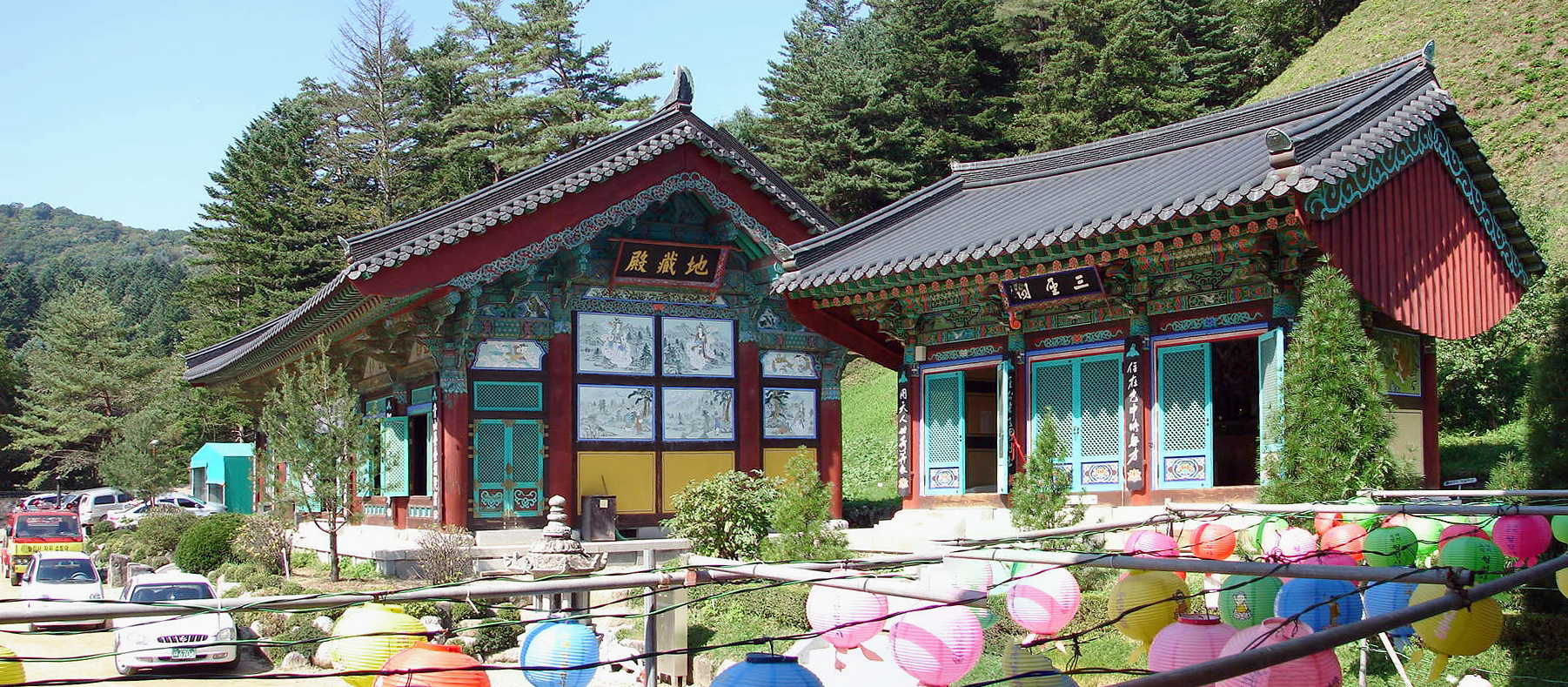
Worship halls at Woljeongsa, located on the eastern slopes of Odaesan

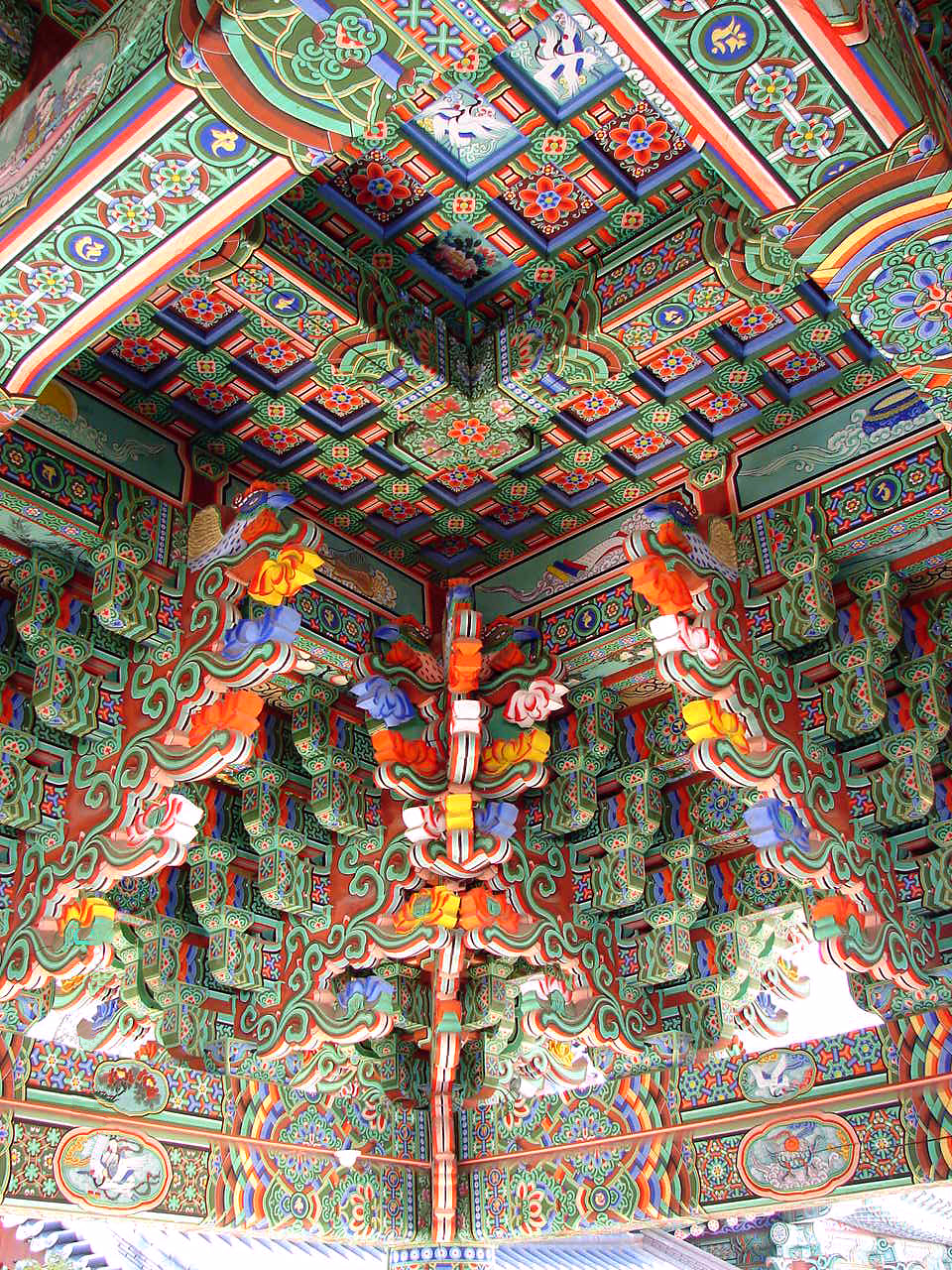
Ceiling of the entrance gate at Woljeongsa

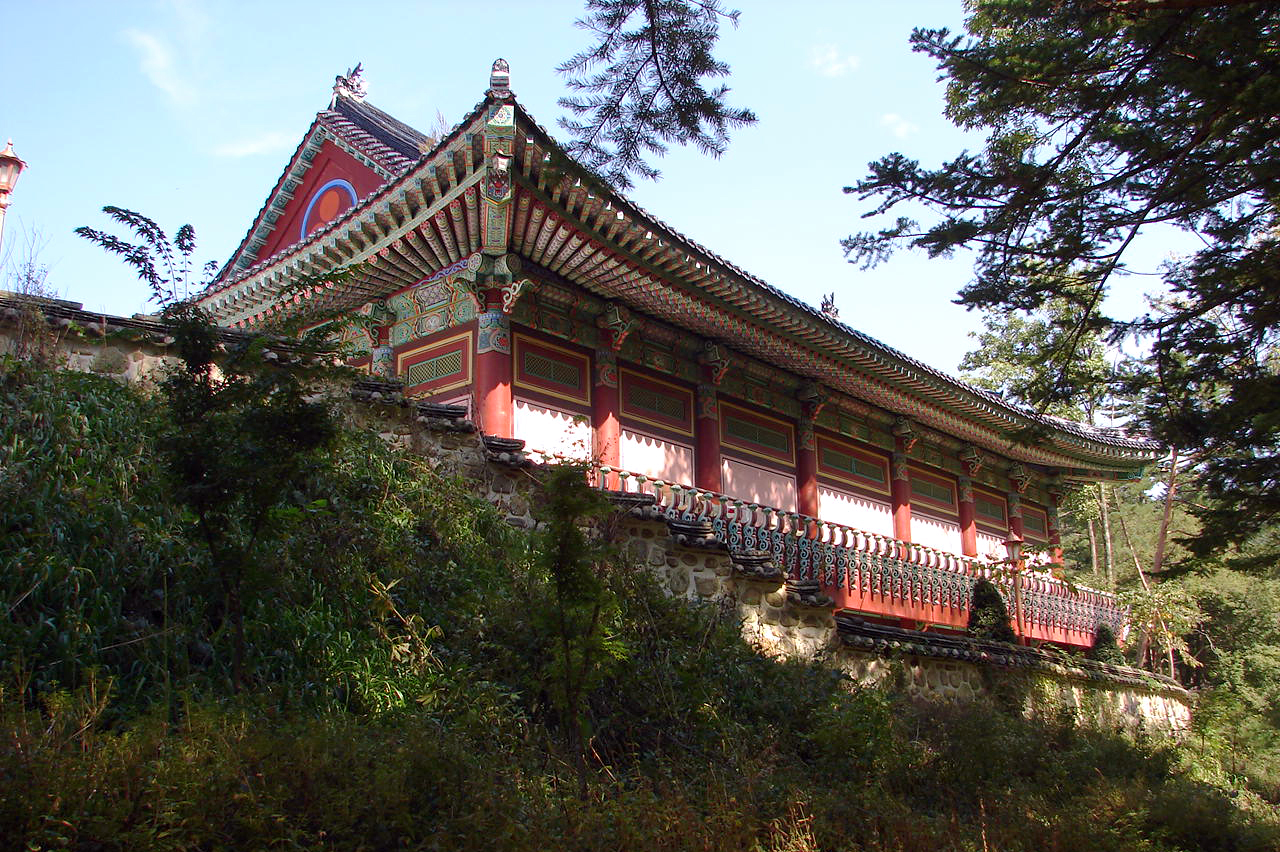
One of the entrance gates at Woljeongsa

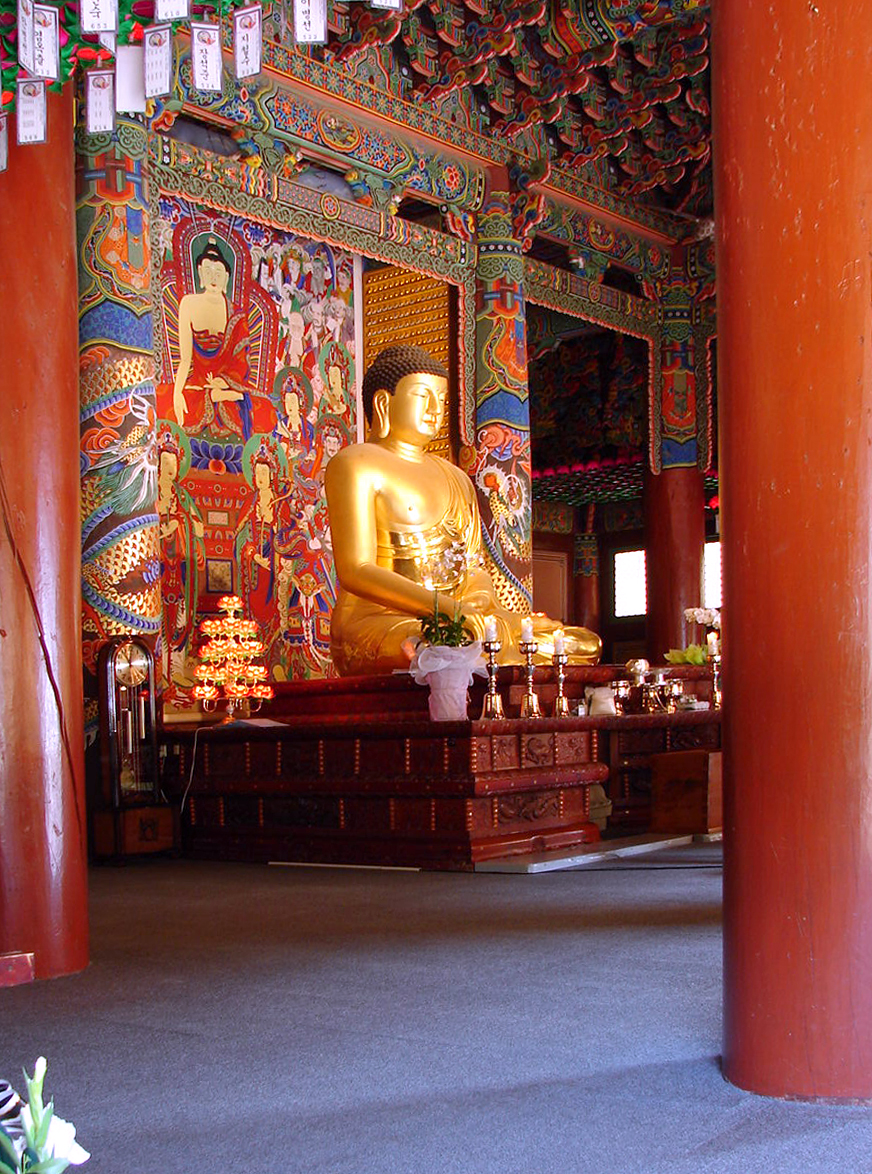
Buddha in one of the worship halls at Woljeongsa

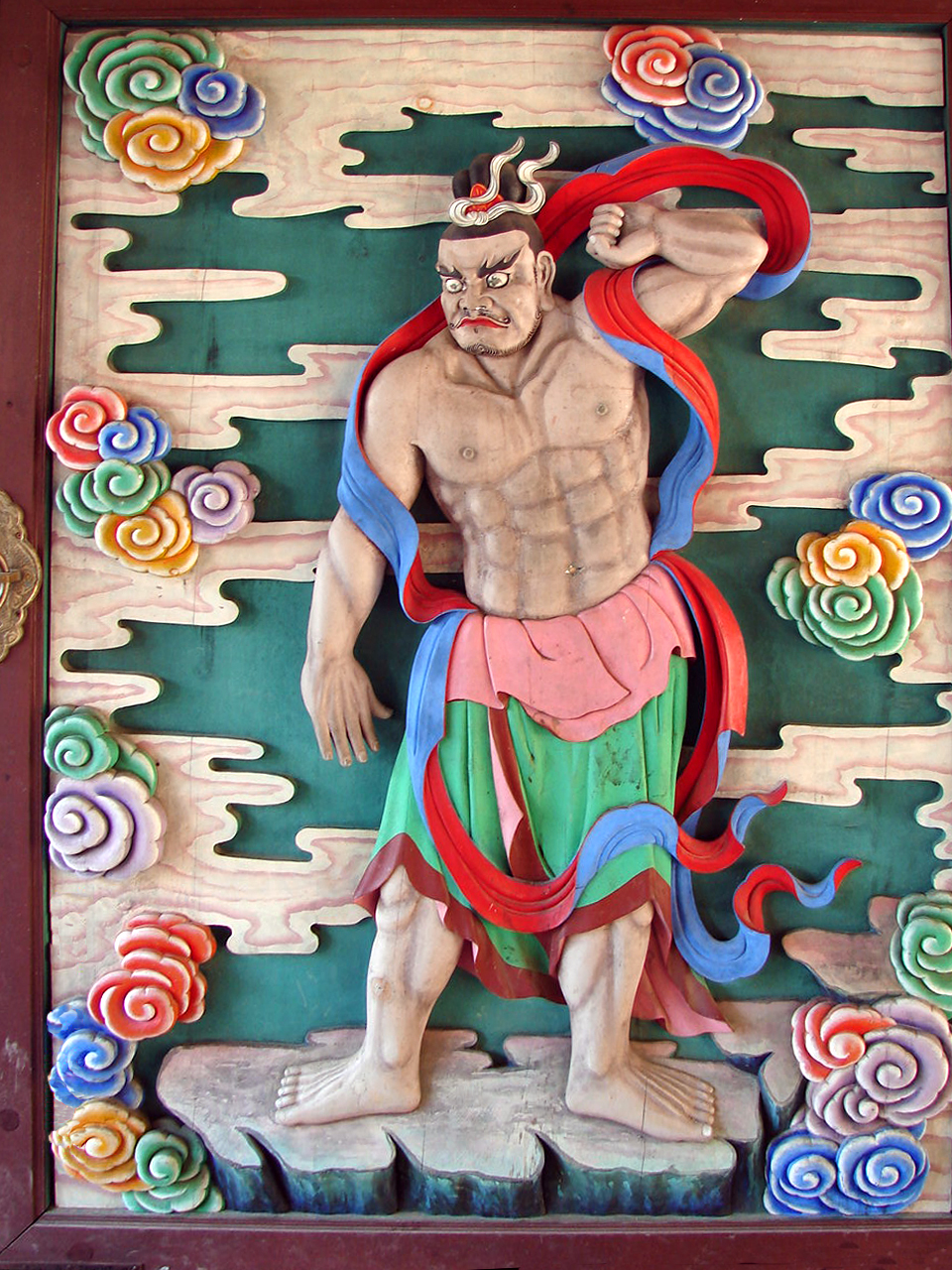
Image in relief on one of the entry gates at Woljeongsa

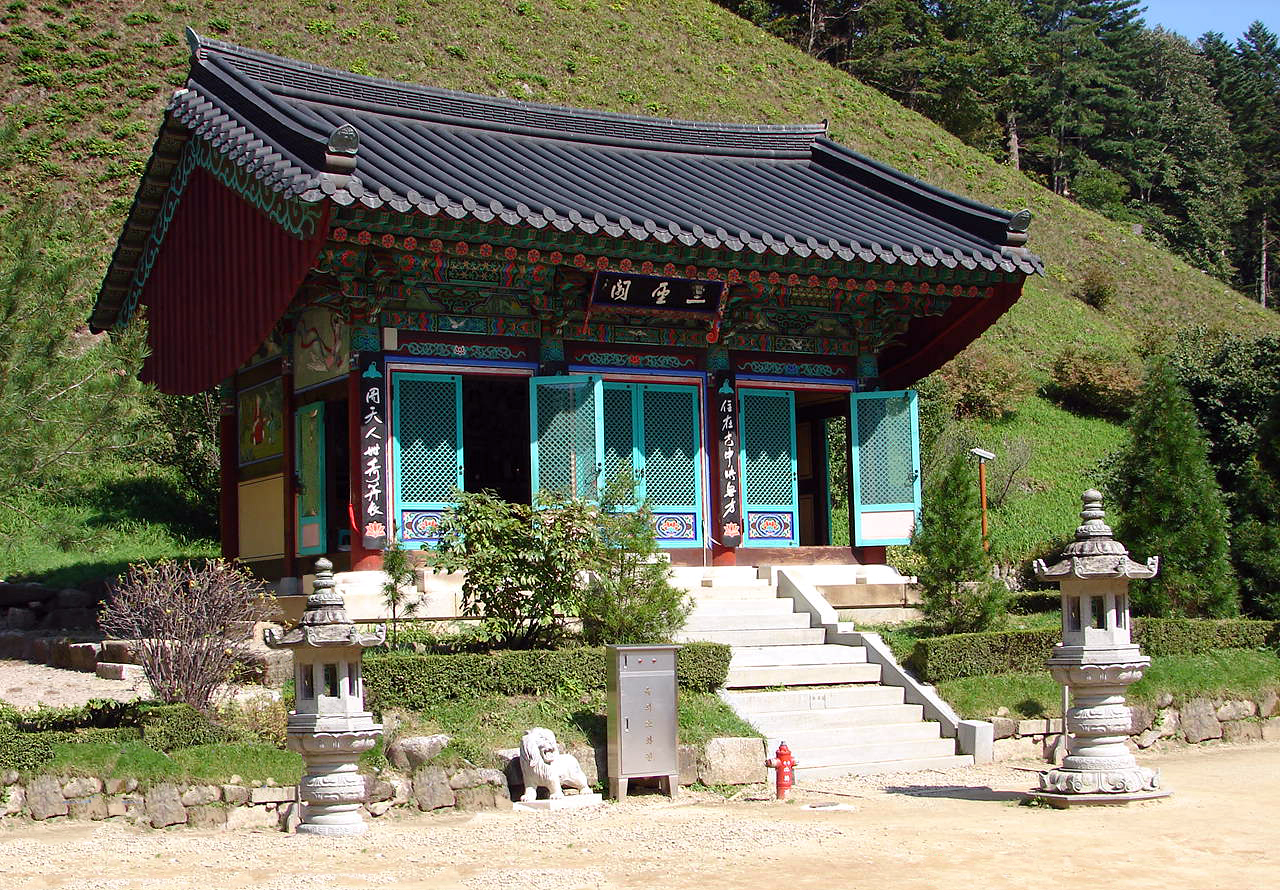
Wolijeongsa is in charge of 60 temples and 8 hermitages

== See also ==
- Buddhist temples in Korea
