= Odaesan National Park =

National park in South Korea

오대산국립공원, 五臺山國立公園
- Odaesan National Park
- IUCN category II (national park)
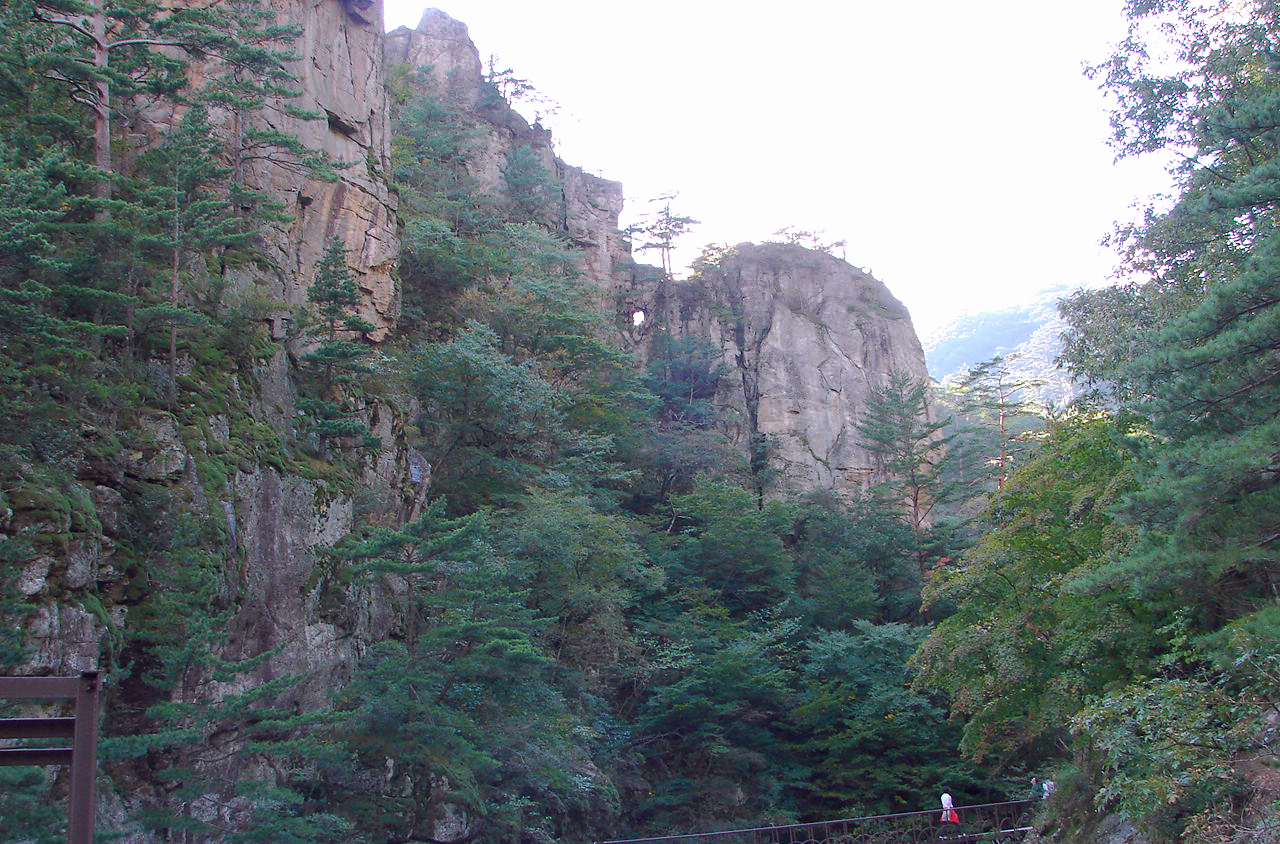
- Interactive map of 오대산국립공원, 五臺山國立公園
- Coordinates: 37°47′43″N 128°32′35″E
- Area: 303.93 km^{2} (117.35 sq mi)
- Established: 1 February 1975
- Governing body: Korea National Park Service

Odaesan National Park (Korean: 오대산국립공원; Hanja: 五臺山國立公園) is located in the province of Gangwon-do, South Korea. It was first designated as the 11th national park in 1975. The park is named after the 1,563-metre (5,128 ft) mountain Odaesan, which means "Five Plains Mountain", named after the five plains between the area's five major peaks. The park is home to a total of 3,788 species: 1,040 plant species, 28 mammal species, 103 bird species, 13 amphibian species, 12 reptile species, 35 fish species, 1,976 insect species and 157 spider species.

The twenty-two national parks of South Korea.
Land-based parks are in red and marine parks are in blue.

The park has some tourist amenities such as campgrounds, walking paths, and pension-style accommodations.
