= Tongdosa =

Buddhist temple at Yangsan, South Korea

Sansa, Buddhist Mountain Monasteries in Korea
UNESCO World Heritage Site
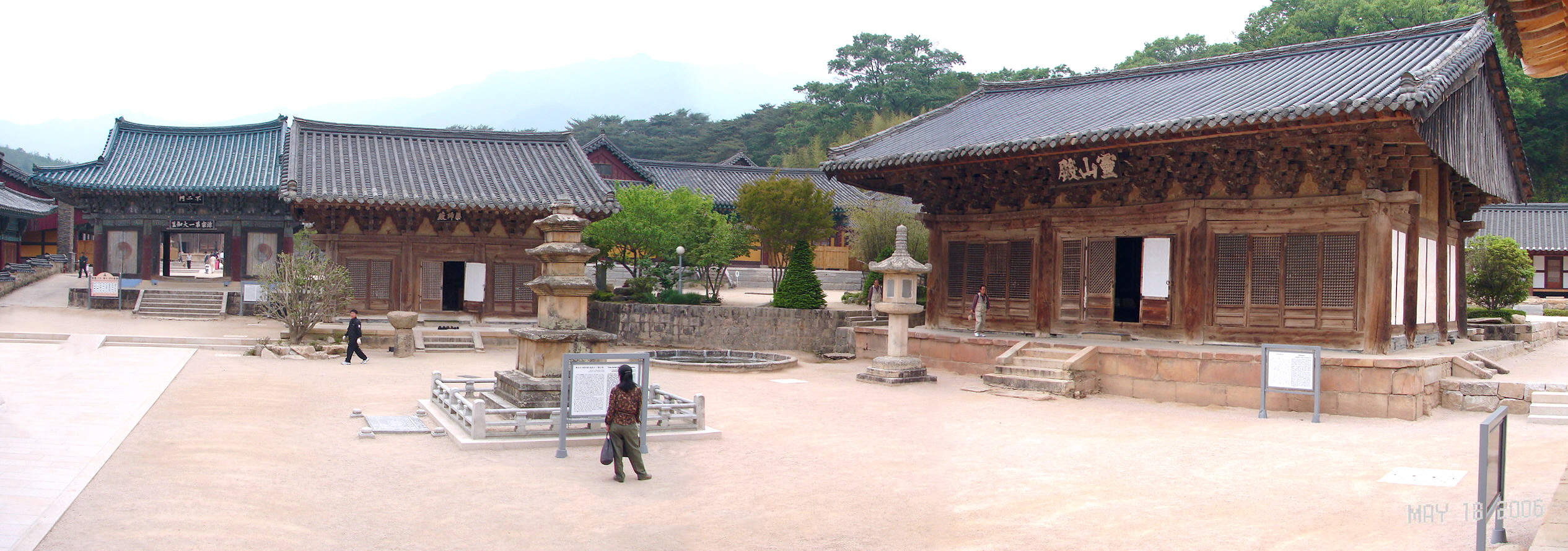
- Gate of Non-Duality (left), Hall of Maitreya (center) and Youngsanjeon (right) buildings with three-story stone pagoda (center fore).

- Location within South Korea
- Location: Yangsan, Republic of Korea
- Criteria: Cultural: iii
- Reference: 1562-1
- Inscription: 2018 (42nd Session)
- Coordinates: 35°29′16″N 129°3′52″E

- Tongdosa
- Hangul: 통도사
- Hanja: 通度寺
- RR: Tongdosa
- MR: T'ongdosa

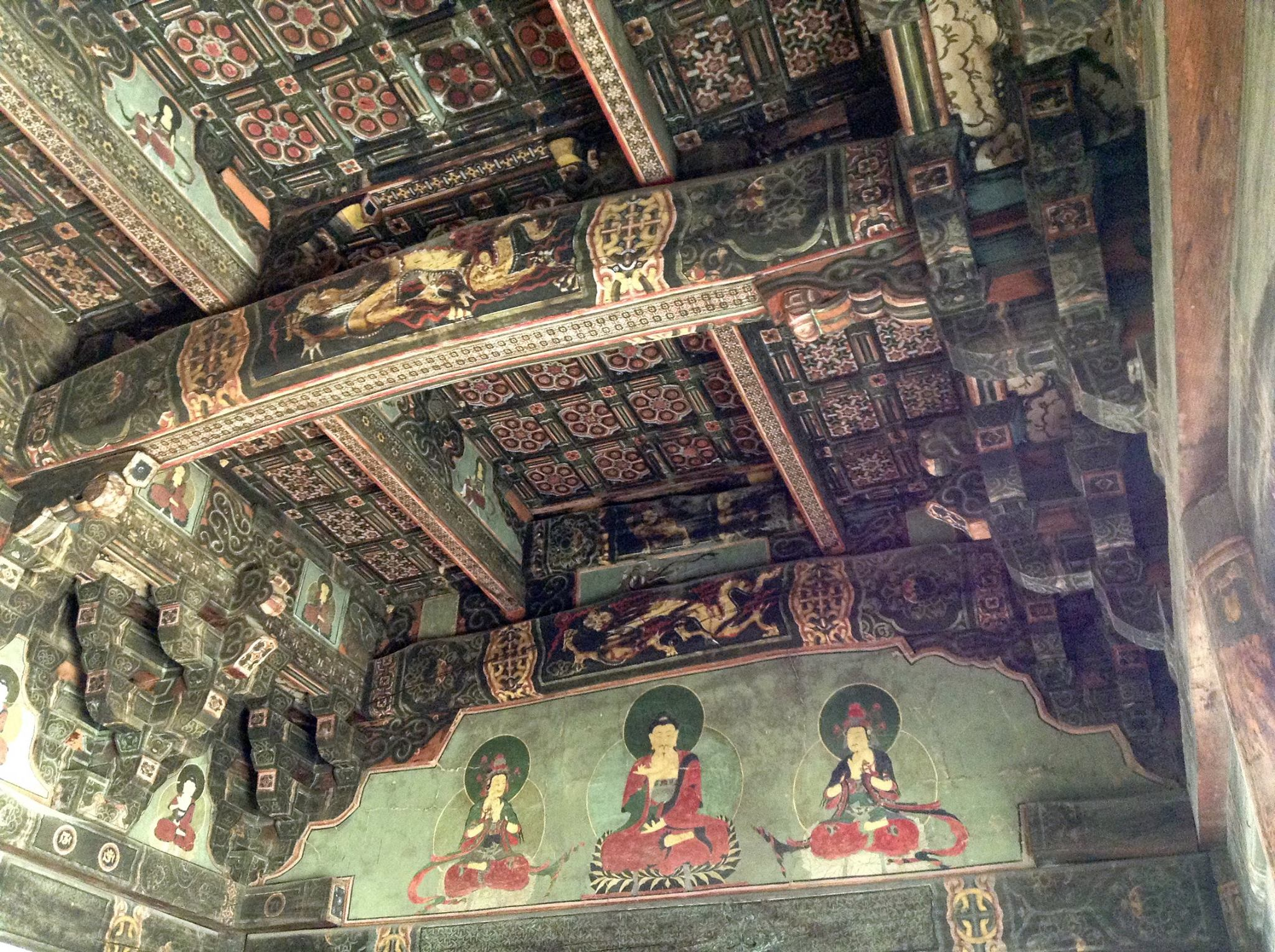
Tongdosa ceiling

Tongdosa (Korean: 통도사; lit. 'Salvation of the World through Mastery of Truth') is a head temple of the Jogye Order of Korean Buddhism and in the southern part of Mt. Chiseosan near Yangsan, South Gyeongsang Province, South Korea.

Tongdosa is one of the Three Jewels Temples and represents Gautama Buddha. (Haeinsa, also in South Gyeongsang Province, represents the dharma or Buddhist teachings; and Songgwangsa in South Jeolla Province represents the sangha or Buddhist community.)

Tongdosa is famous because there are no statues outside of the Buddha at the temple because the "real shrines of the Buddha" (relics) are preserved at Tongdosa. Courtyards at the temple are arrayed around several pagodas that house the Buddha's relics.

== Origins ==
Tongdosa was established by the monk Jajang-yulsa after returning from Tang China in 646 AD, during the reign of Queen Seondeok of Silla. It thrived throughout the Later Silla and Goryeo periods (918-1392), when Buddhism was the state religion, and remained strong even during Joseon.

Tongdosa is reputed to house several relics of the Buddha himself, including a robe, a begging bowl, and a bone from his skull, all relics that Jajang-yulsa brought back from the travels to Tang China he undertook in 636 to study with ten other monks.

Only one building, the Mahavira Hall (main Dharma worship hall), survived the Japanese invasions of Korea (1592–98) in the late 16th century; the other buildings were rebuilt later that period. In the mid 15th century at the height of its prosperity, Tongdosa is said to have had hundreds of buildings and thousands of monks. For over 1,300 years Tongdosa's Beopdeung (temple candle) has never gone out.

=== Legend ===
Legend has it that at the time of Tongdosa's founding there were nine evil dragons living in a big pond. Jajang-yulsa enjoined the dragons to leave by reciting a magic texts. They refused to leave so Jajang-yulsa inscribed the Chinese character for fire on a sheet of paper and tossed it skyward while using his long stick to splash the pond.

The water began to boil. The dragons could not endure the heat so three tried to escape and flew off, became disoriented, and died by colliding into a cliff called Yonghyeolam ("dragon blood rock"). Five of the dragons flew southwest into a valley now called Oryonggok ("five dragon valley").

The last dragon, blinded by the heat, made a vow to Jajang-yulsa that if he spared his life and allowed him to stay in the pond forever, the blind dragon would always guard the temple. Jajang-yulsa granted the dragon's request and the dragon was allowed to stay as protector of the temple. Nine Dragons Pond, now called Guryongji, still stands beside the main temple hall.

== Temple today ==
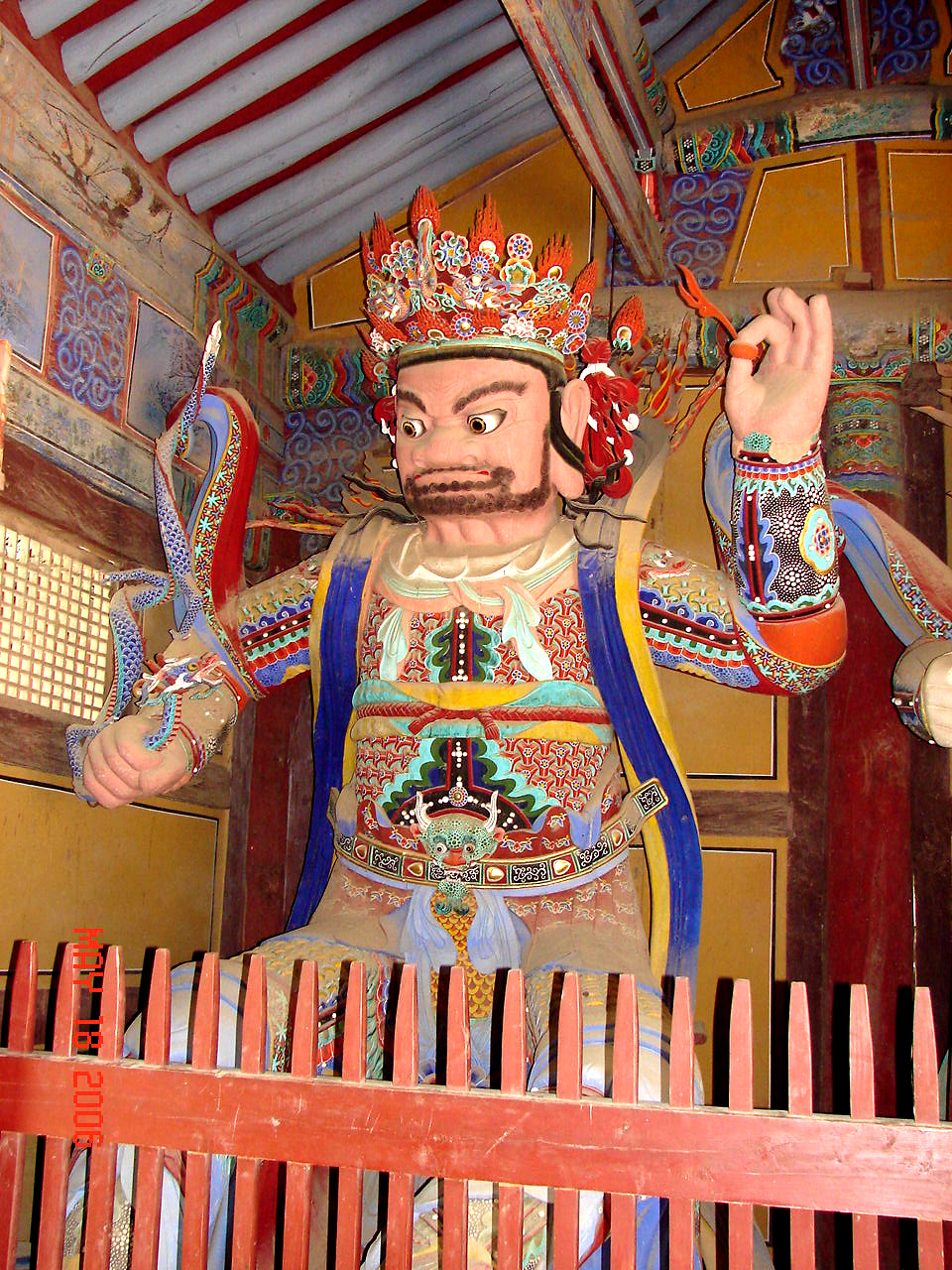
One of the Four Heavenly Kings, Virūpākṣa - King of the West, in the Tongdosa Guardian Gate

Korea's largest temple, Tongdosa, is often called "the temple without a Buddha" because it contains no outdoor statues of the Buddha; rather it is arranged around several stupas which contain Jajang-yulsa's relics of the historical Buddha.

The road that meanders up to the temple wanders through a forest called "Pine trees dancing in the wind". 65 buildings separately house a shrine for virtually every major Buddhist deity. The temple does not seem especially large because many of the buildings are dispersed throughout the surrounding mountainside. 13 hermitages can be found on the temple complex grounds. The buildings are varied in architectural style with many left unpainted or faded. One of the buildings contains a fine mural depicting a boat escorting the deceased into paradise.

A museum on the temple grounds displays an excellent collection of artwork. Today at this temple there are 19 local treasures and 794 local cultural properties.

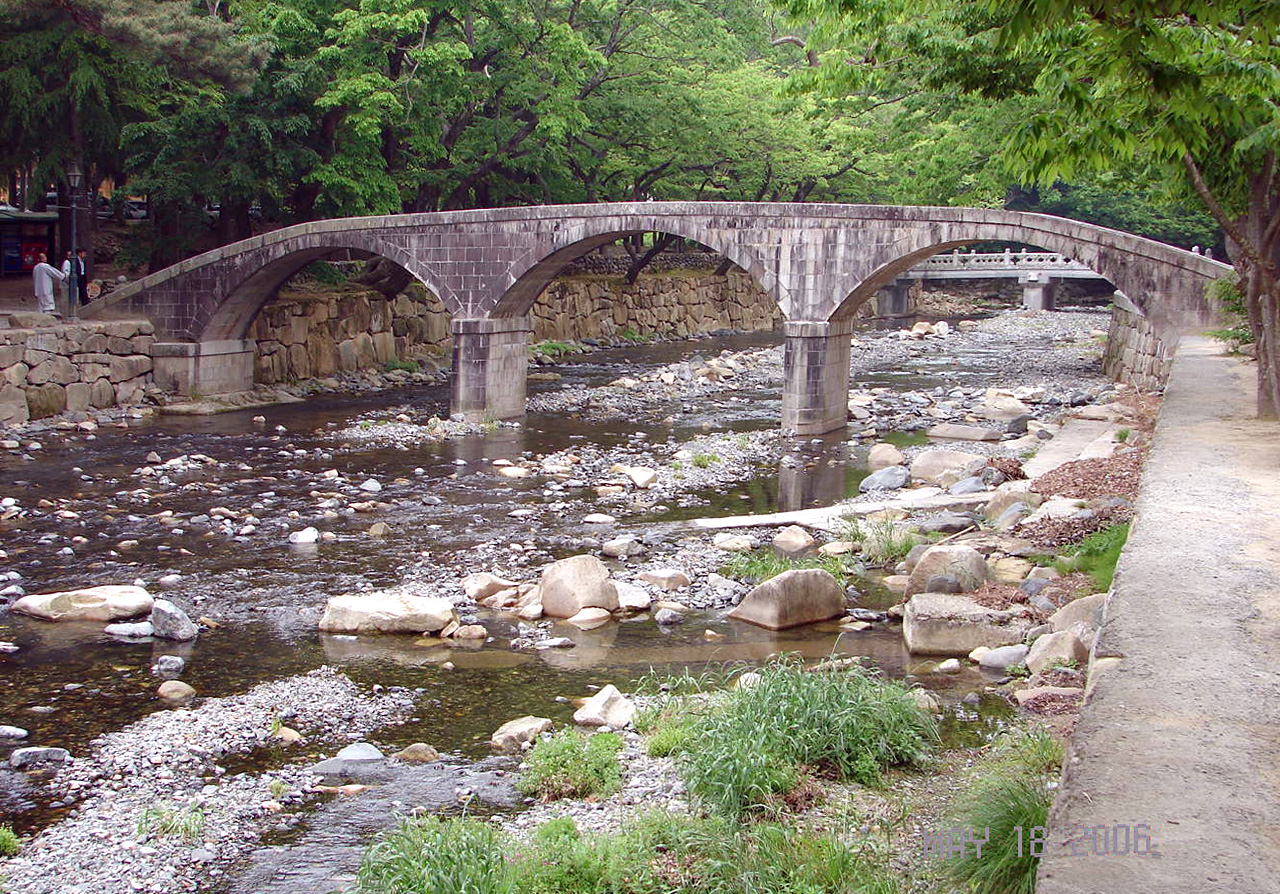
Samseongbanwol or One Mind Bridge near entrance

Approaching the entrance the first bridge one sees is Samseongbanwol — Three Arch Bridge — meaning three stars and a half moon, sometimes also called the One Mind Bridge. The Chinese character is composed of four strokes; when applying the strokes to the name of the bridge, the long stroke stands for a half moon and the others, three stars.

The first gate to the temple, Iljumun, is called the One-Pillar Gate because when viewed from the side the gate appears to be supported by a single pillar. This symbolizes the support of the world and the one true path of enlightenment. Iljumun is the boundary between the spiritual world and the secular world.

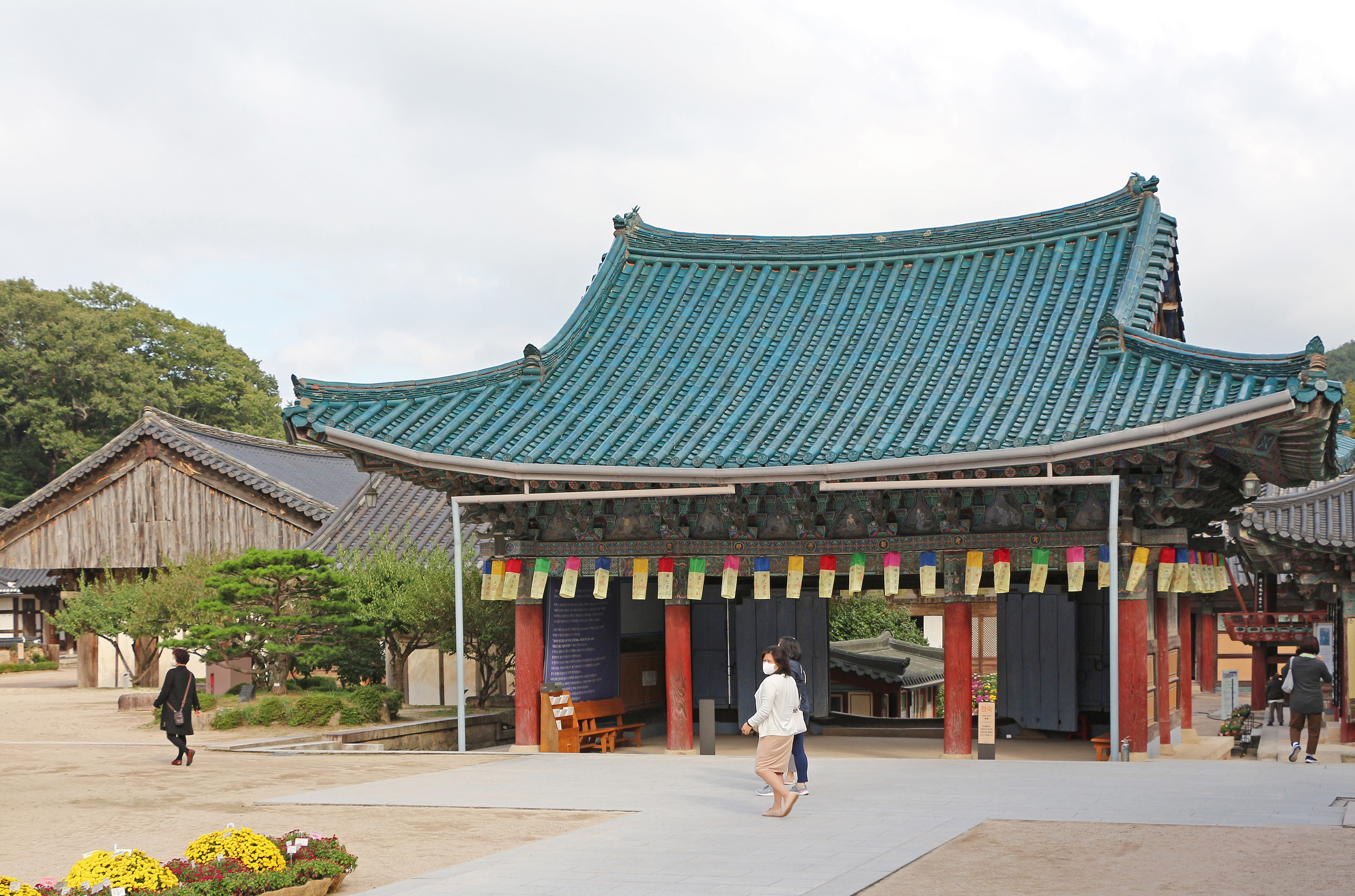
Purimun, the Gate of Non-Duality - South Gyeongsang Provincial Tangible Cultural Property #252.

The following gate is the Gate of the Guardians of the Four Directions or Four Heavenly Kings, each of whom watches over one cardinal direction. They are the protectors of the world and fighters of evil, each able to command a legion of supernatural creatures to protect the Dharma (Buddhist teachings).

Next comes the third gate of the temple, Purimun, known as the Gate of Non-Duality. The world across this gate is one of non-duality, where there is no distinction between the Buddha and human beings, being and non-being, good and evil, and fullness and emptiness. During Purimun's long history the gate has been rebuilt many times.

The present Gate of Non-Duality was constructed in the late Joseon Dynasty and was built to line up straight with the One Pillar Gate, Guardian Gate, and Daeungjeon (main Dharma hall). The gate of Non-Duality is the left most structure in the first picture at the top of the page.

Purimun, the Gate of Non-Duality, is designated South Gyeongsang Provincial Tangible Cultural Property #252.

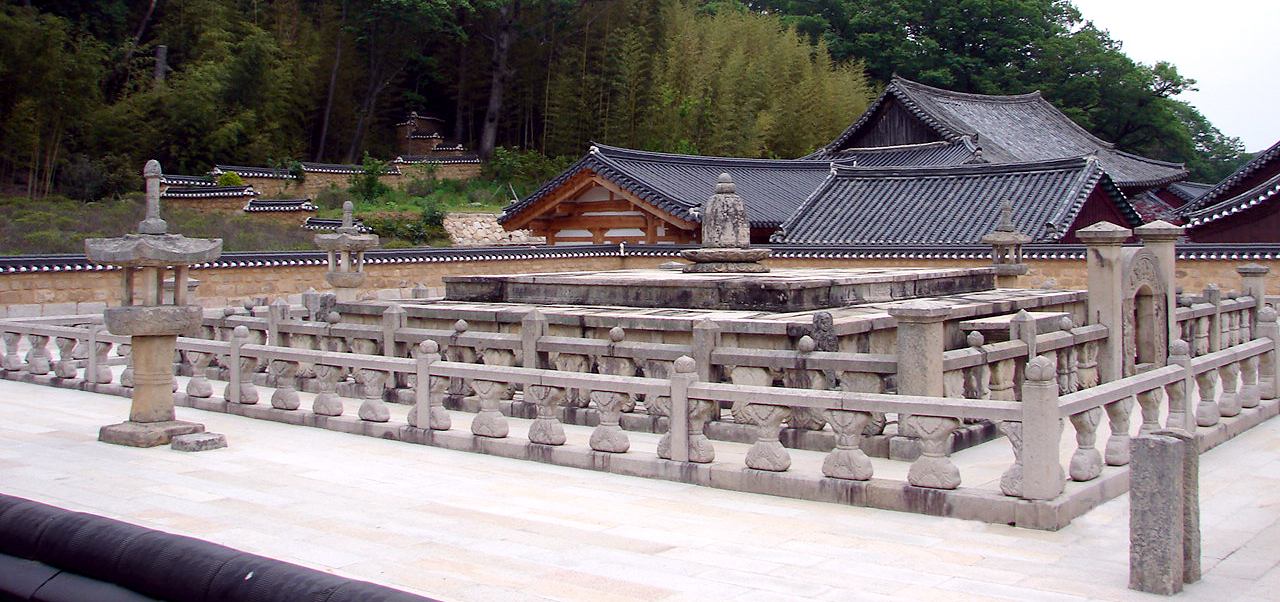
Geumgang Gyedan (Diamond Altar) behind Daeungjeon (main Dharma Hall)

Tongdosa is one of five temples in Korea, known as Jeokmyeolbogung, which enshrine the relics of the Buddha that Jajang-yulsa returned from China. Tongdosa is the ‘Buddha Jewel Temple’ because it enshrines Sari Jinsin (the Buddha’s relics) in the Geumgang Gyedan (Diamond Altar), a platform for the ceremony prevailing Buddhist precepts, behind Daeungjeon (main Dharma Hall).

There is no image of the Buddha or Bodhisattvas, as is typically found in a worship hall, in Tongdosa. Instead a Buddhist altar that spans east to west inside along the front with a window, in the place of a Buddha image, looks out on the Geumgang Gyedan (Diamond Altar).

Tongdosa's Daeungjeon is National Treasure #290.

== Gallery ==
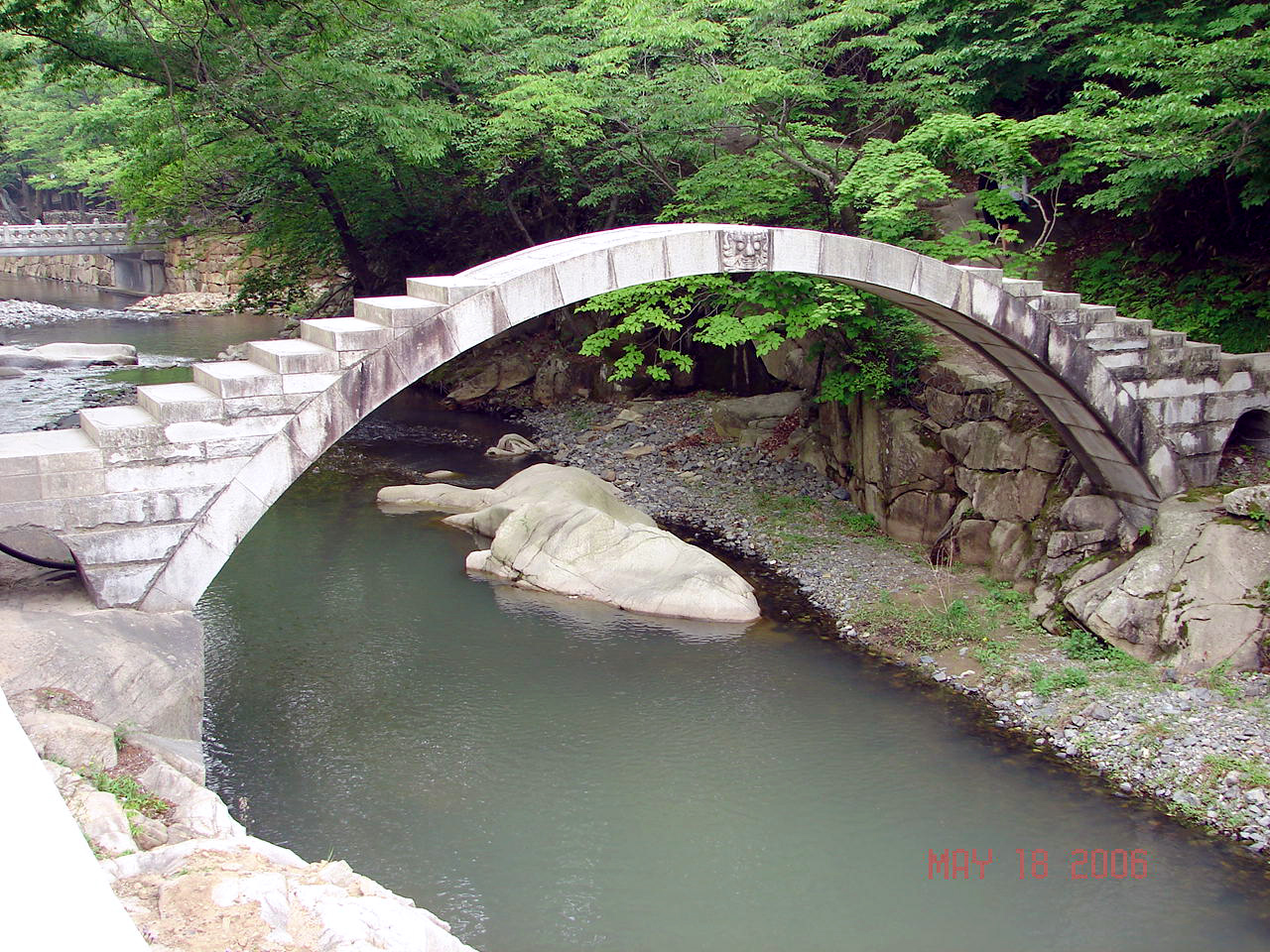
Single Arch Bridge

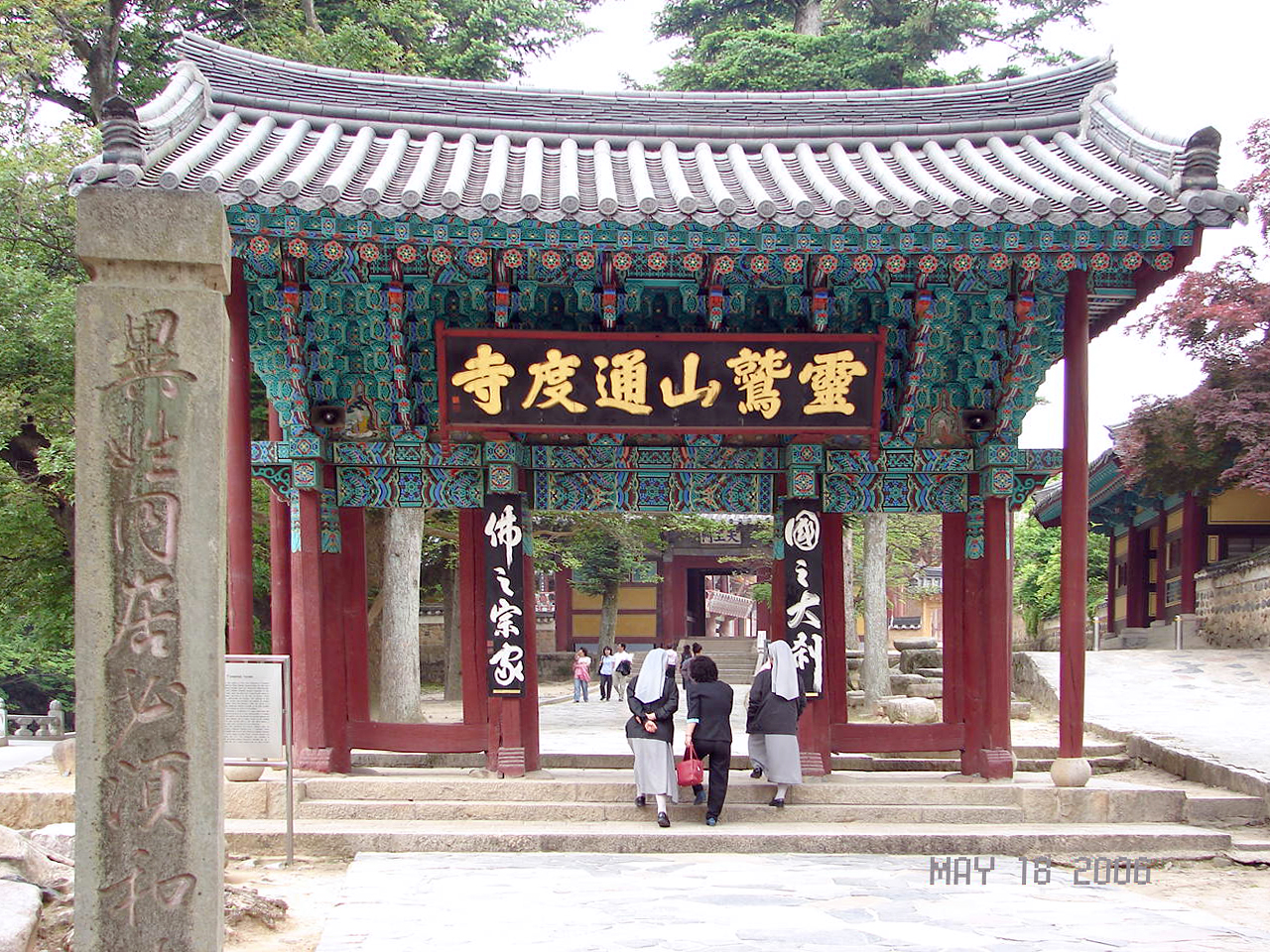
First or One Pillar Gate at the entrance to Tongdosa

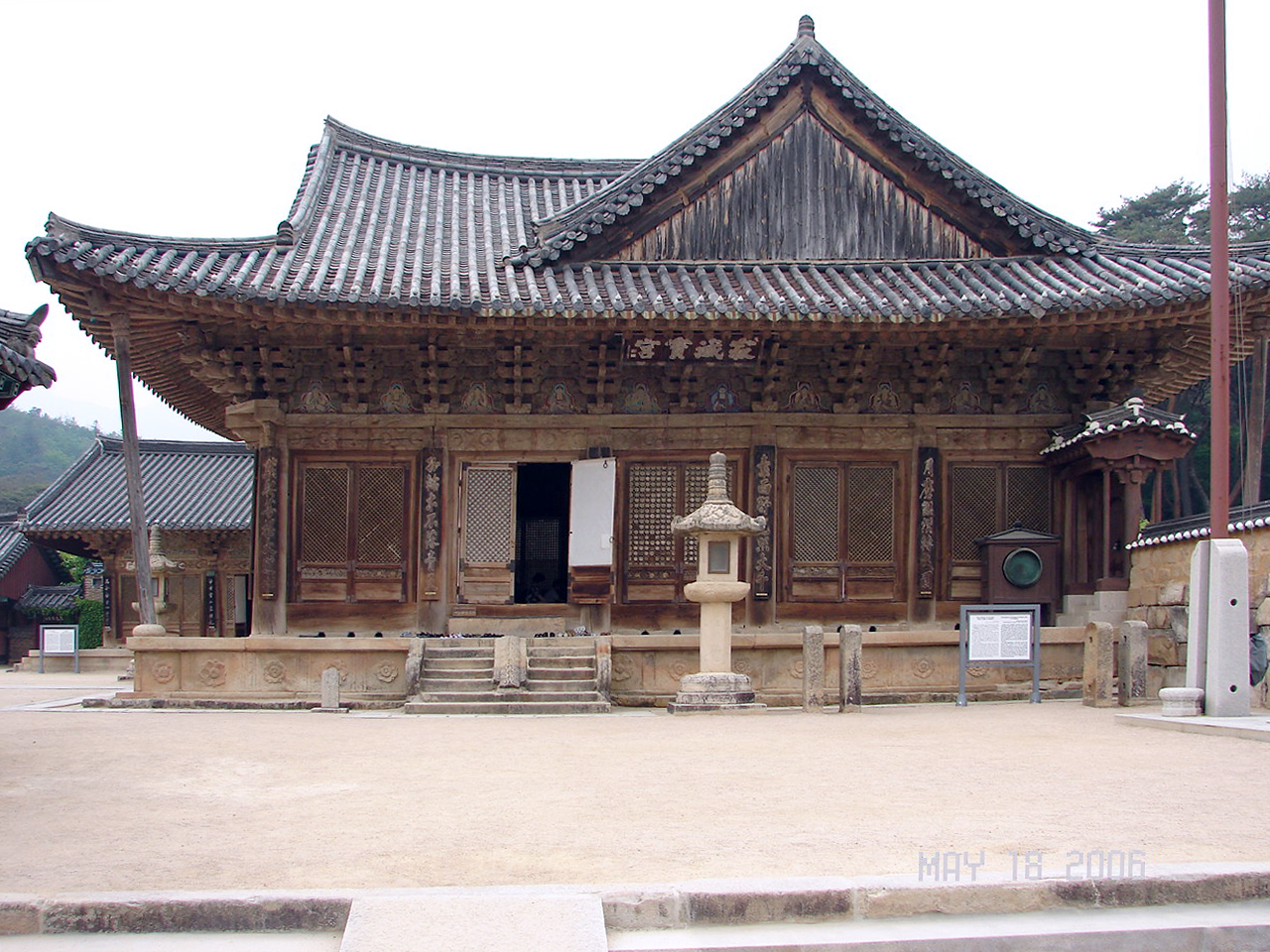
Daeungjeon, the Main Worship Hall, National Treasure #290

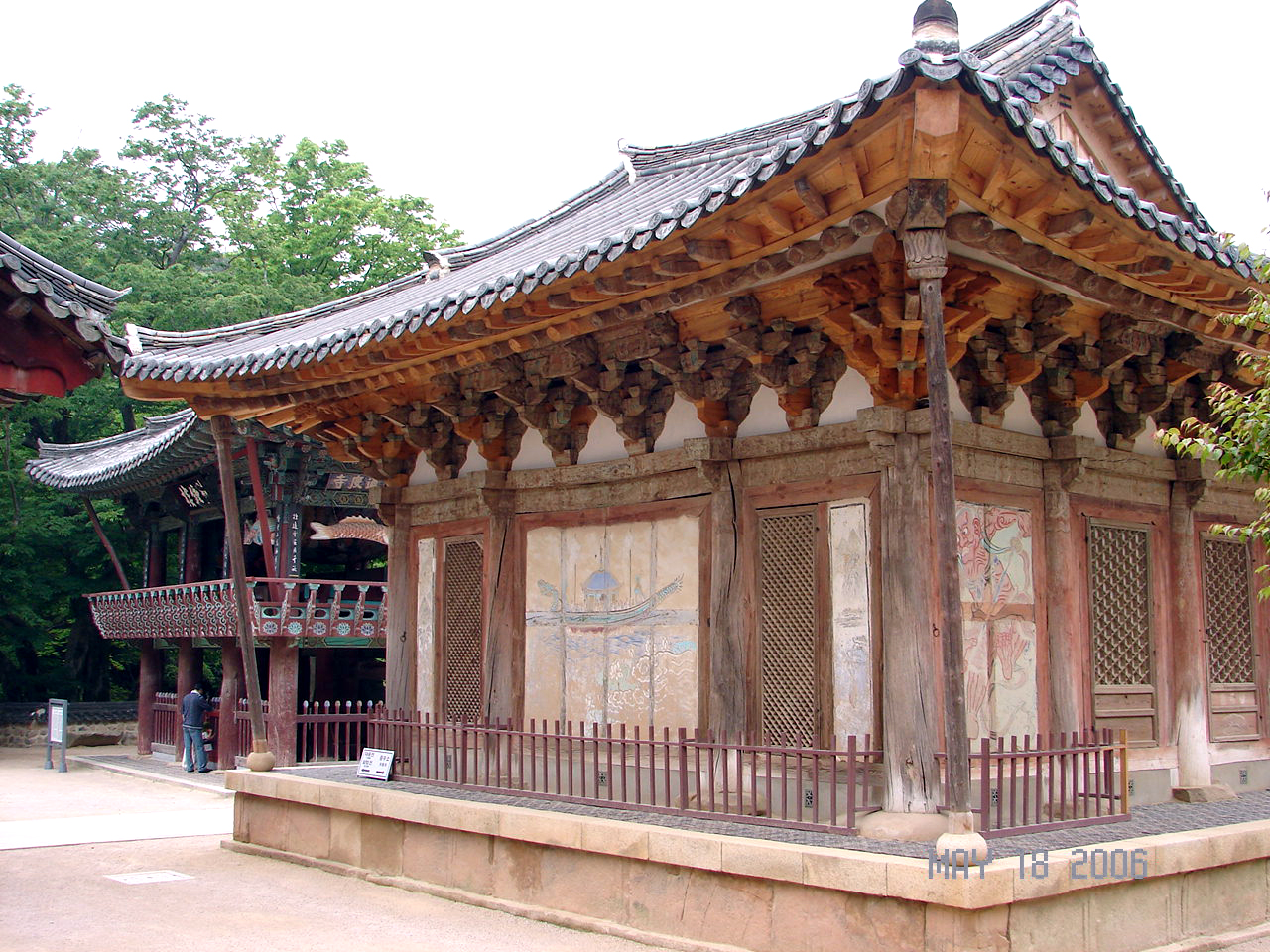
Geukrakbojeon Hall

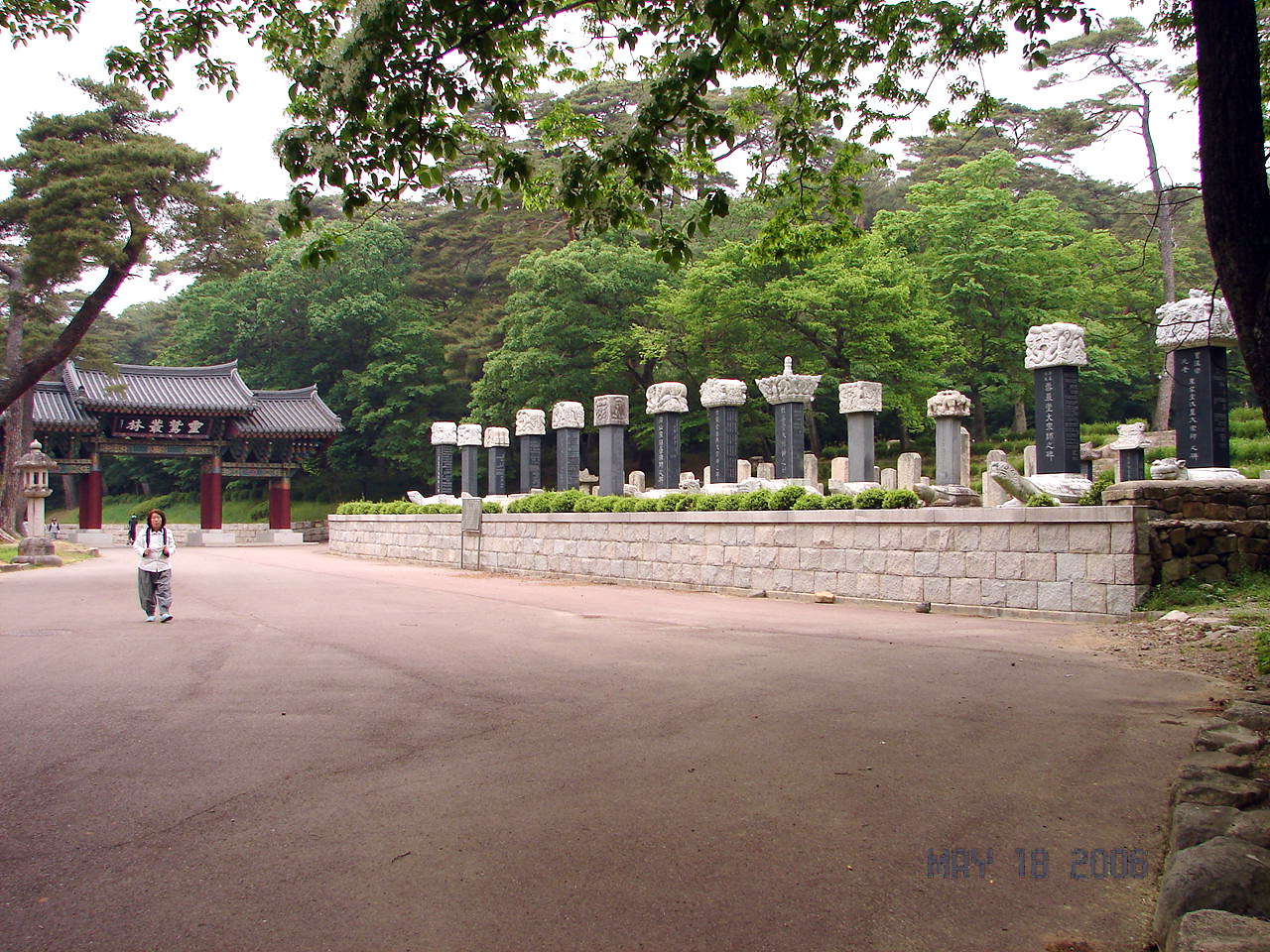
Tongdosa Steles and Stupas

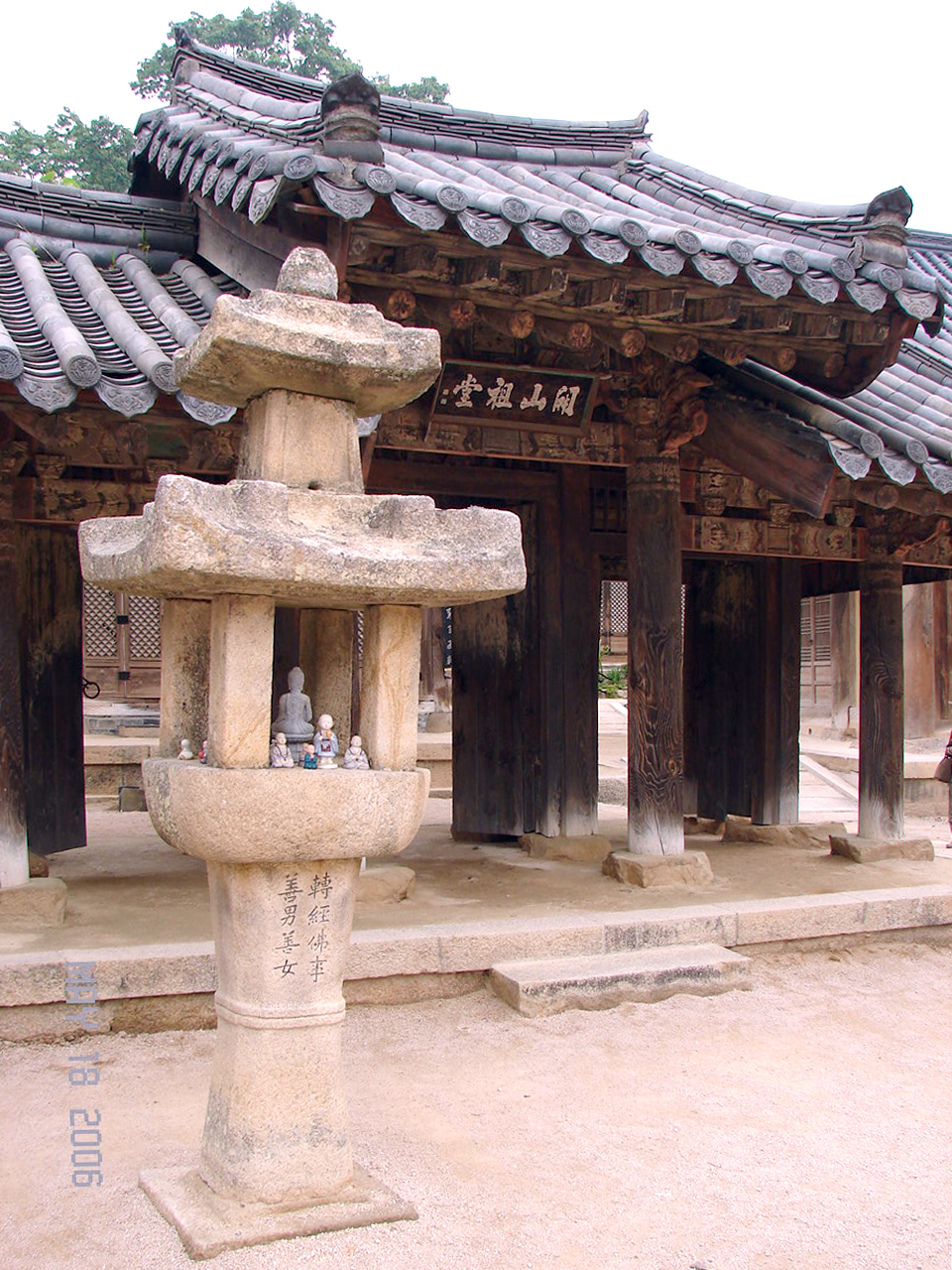
Stone Lantern and Gate

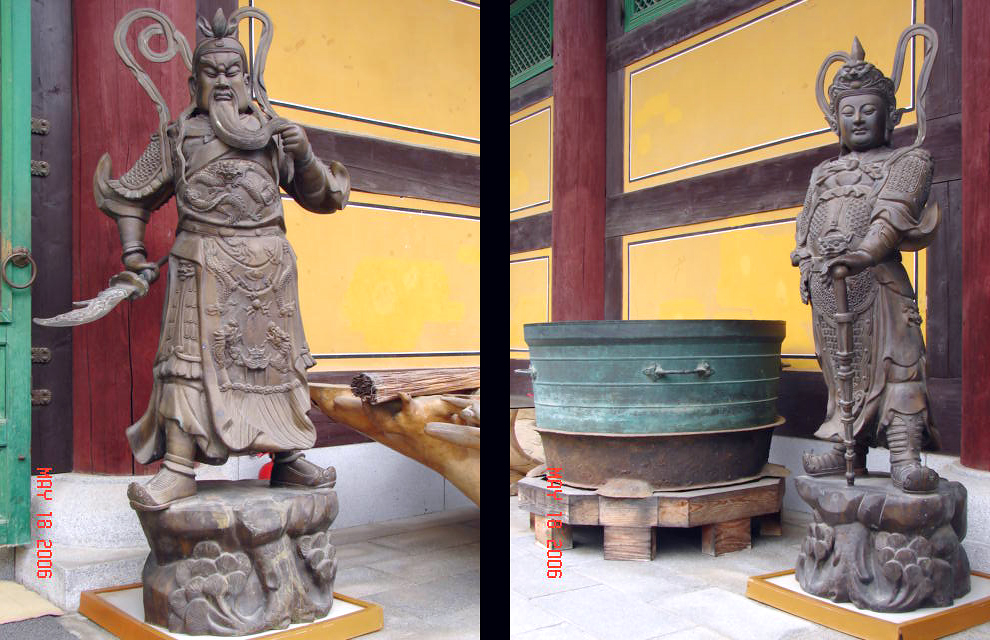
Museum Pieces

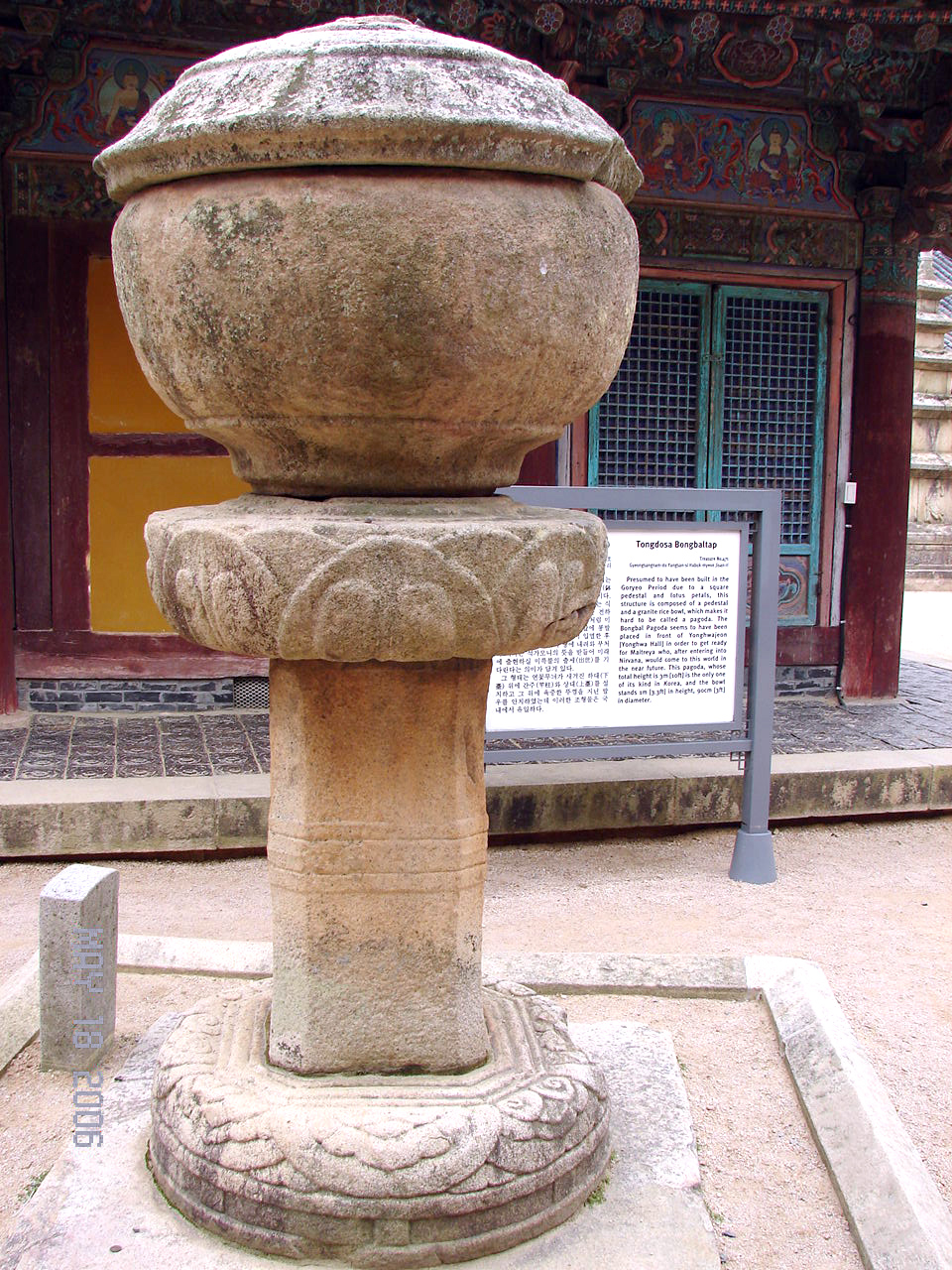
Bongbaltap Stupa

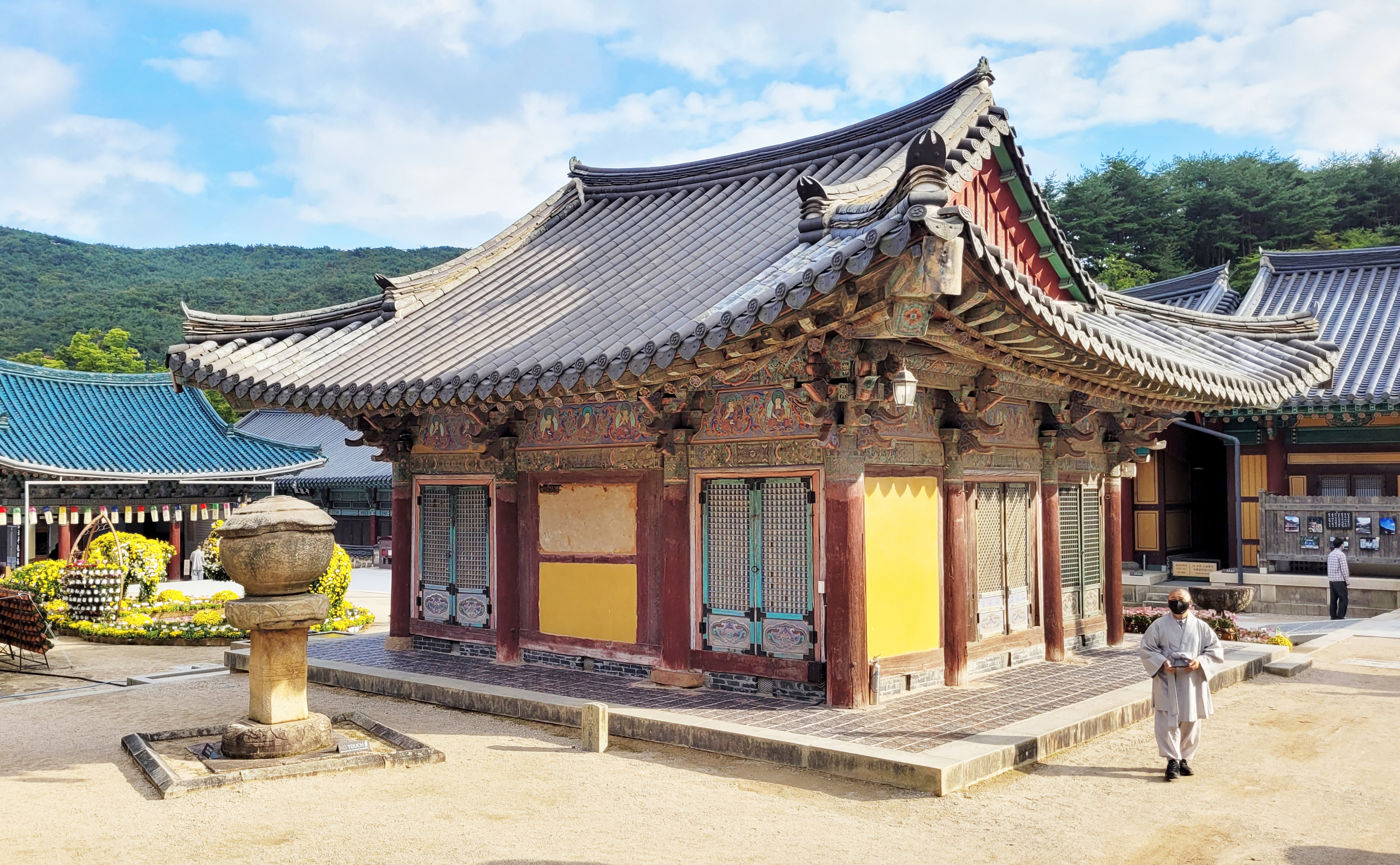
Gwaneumjeon Hall

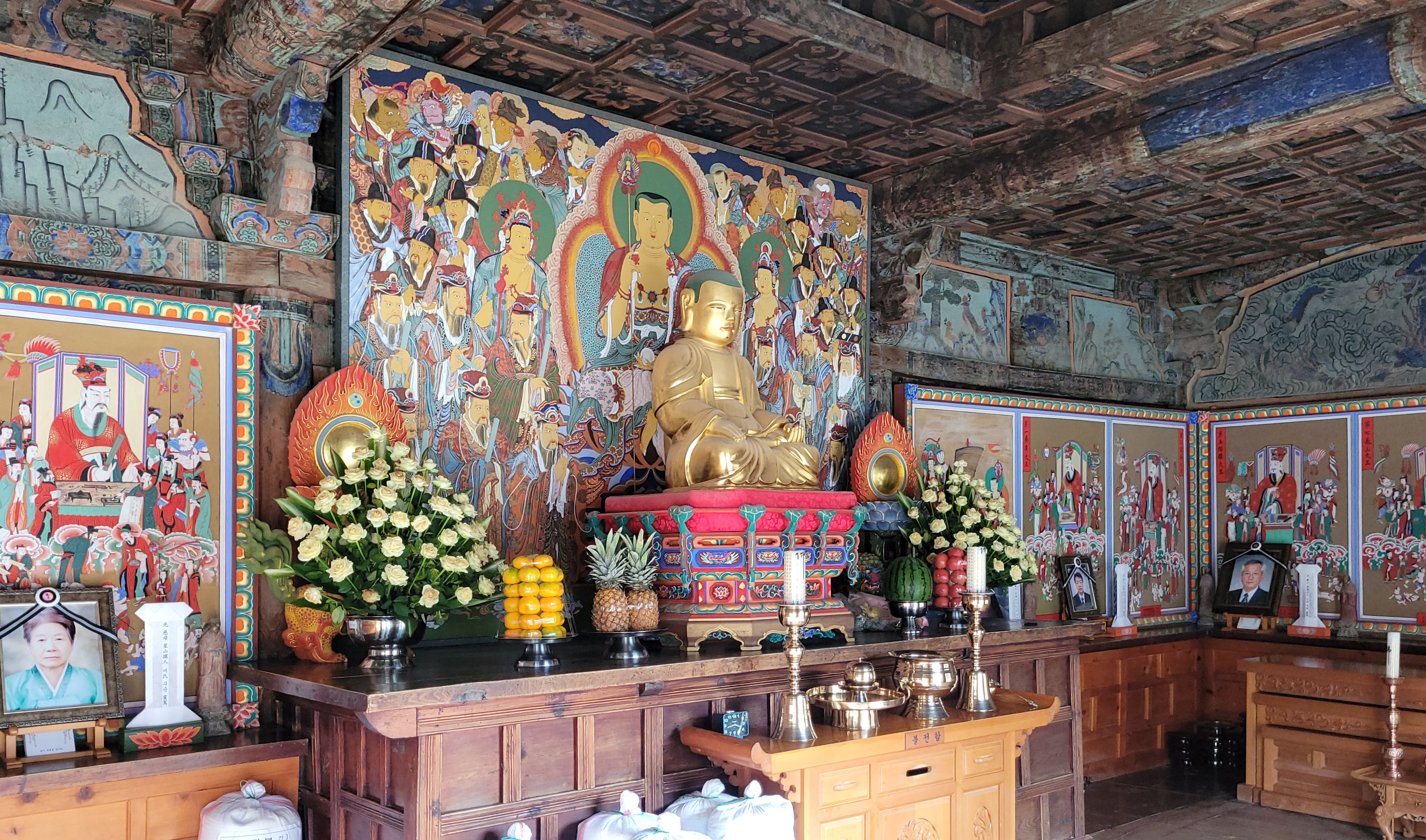
Eungjinjeon Hall

== See also ==
- Korean Buddhist temples
- Korean temple cuisine
- Temple Stay
- Three Jewel Temples of Korea
- List of South Korean tourist attractions
