= Noinbong =

Mountain in South Korea

Highest point
- Elevation: 1,338.1 m (4,390 ft)

Geography
- Location: South Korea

Korean name
- Hangul: 노인봉
- Hanja: 老人峰
- RR: Noinbong
- MR: Noinbong

Noinbong (Korean: 노인봉) is a mountain in Gangneung and Pyeongchang County, Gangwon Province, South Korea. It has an elevation of 1,338.1 m (4,390 ft).

== See also ==
- List of mountains in Korea
