= Oseam (2003 film) =

- Hangul: 오세암
- RR: Oseam
- MR: Oseam
- Directed by: Sung Baek-yeop
- Written by: Choi Min-yong; Lee Seo-kyeong; Sung Baek-yeop
- Based on: Oseam by Jeong Chae-bong
- Produced by: Sung Baek-yeop
- Cinematography: Mun Seong-cheol
- Music by: Kang Ho-jeong
- Distributed by: Sinabro Entertainment
- Release date: April 25, 2003
- Running time: 77 minutes
- Country: South Korea
- Language: Korean
- Budget: $1.5 million

Oseam (Korean: 오세암) is a 2003 South Korean drama/religious animated film directed by Sung Baek-yeop. It is based on a novel by Korean author Jeong Chae-bong, who has described it as being a fairy tale for adults. The title means "five-year-old temple."

== Plot ==
Gilson and Gami

Oseam follows two orphans, Gami (감이) and her younger brother Gilson (길손). Gami is a gentle and reserved blind girl, while Gilson is hyperactive and often gets into mischief. The two seek refuge at a Mahayana Buddhist temple, helping with the chores, as they cope with the loss of their mother and home several years ago due to a fire accident, which is also how Gami lost her sight. Gilson, too young to understand, still believes they will find their mother someday as Gami has never told him she died in the fire. Gilson accompanies a monk to go meditate in the mountains and find a cure for his sister's blindness, but ends up sacrificing his life for Gami's sight.

The movie is very slowly paced, often quite slice-of-life in its approach, though dotted with moments of flashback and briefly intense scenes. A lot of emphasis is placed on the characters, particularly the orphans.

== Cast ==
Character	Korean Voice actor	English voice actor
Gilson	Kim Seo-yeong	
Gami	Seong-Yeong Bak	
Boy #1	Bae Jeong-min	
Ilji	Jong-Hwan Son	
Boy #2	Joo-Yeon Oh	
Set Monk	Pyo Yeong-jae	

== Releases ==
Due to its release limited to South Korea and France, this movie is little known to English speakers. DVDs with English language subtitles do exist, but are only available as region 3 DVDs.

== Reception ==
It has received a number of awards at film festivals around the world, such as the Amsterdam Fantastic Film Festival. It won "Best Animated Film" at the Asia-Pacific Film Festival and the Annecy International Animated Film Festival in 2004.

== See also ==
- List of animated feature films
