= Bell of Sangwonsa =

8th century bell from Korea

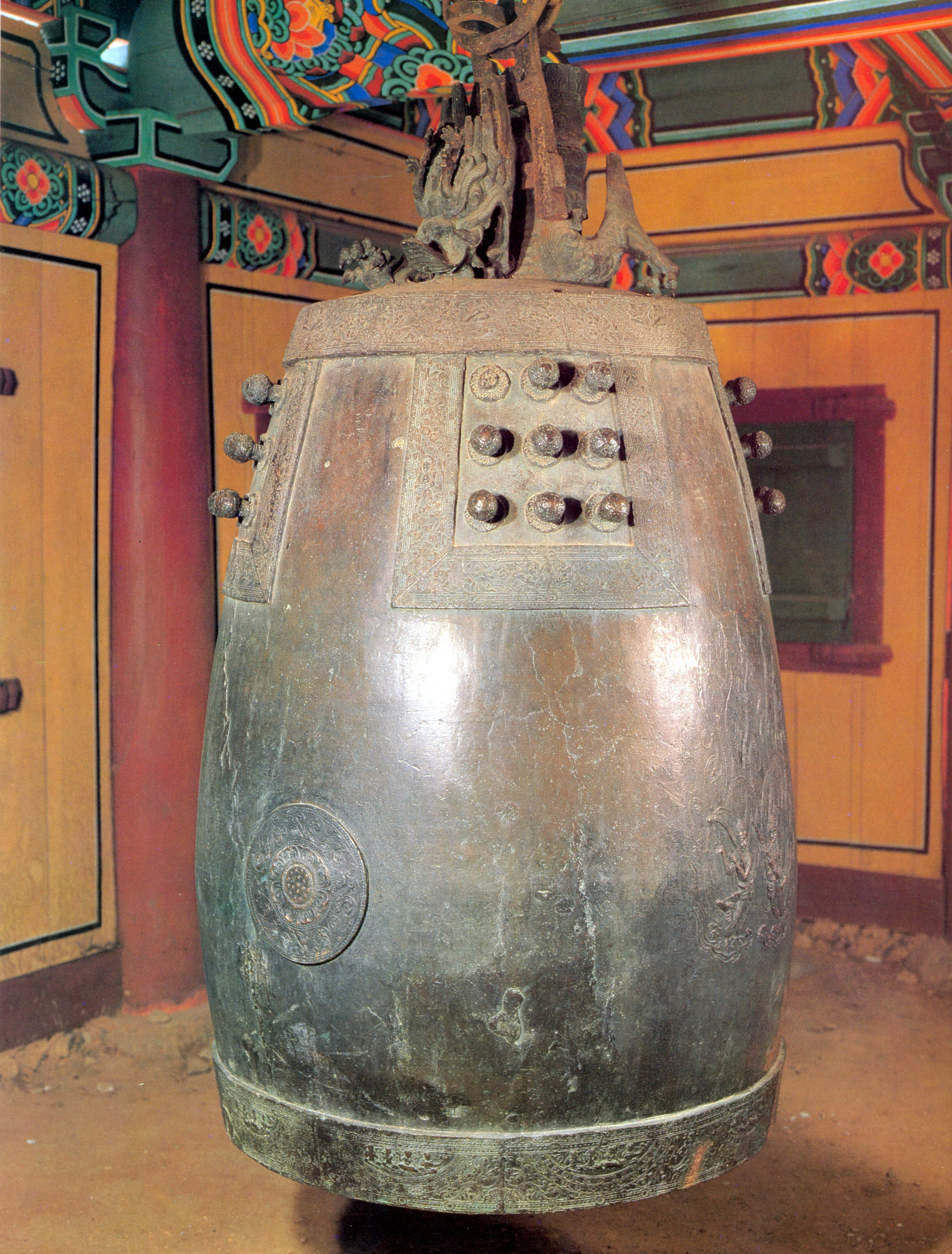
Bell of Sangwonsa Korean: 상원사 동종

The Bell of Sangwonsa (Korean: 상원사 동종) is a bronze bell designated as National Treasures of South Korea #36. It is located in the Sangwonsa temple in Pyeongchang County, Gangwon Province.

== Description ==
Cast in 725, it is one of the three complete Buddhist bronze bells from the Unitied Silla period. It is 167cm in height and 91cm in diameter, with the very top of the bell featuring a dragon with a large head, its claws forming a ring, while lotus patterns decorate its tube. Bead decorations can be found at the top and bottom of the bell body and vine patterns are carved inside. Occasionally there are semicircles with relief patterns depicting one to four musicians. In each four frames are nine lotus-shaped buds; below them are two statues of flying celestial beings playing the gonghu and saeng while facing each other. Bead and lotus patterns adorn the part where the bell is struck.

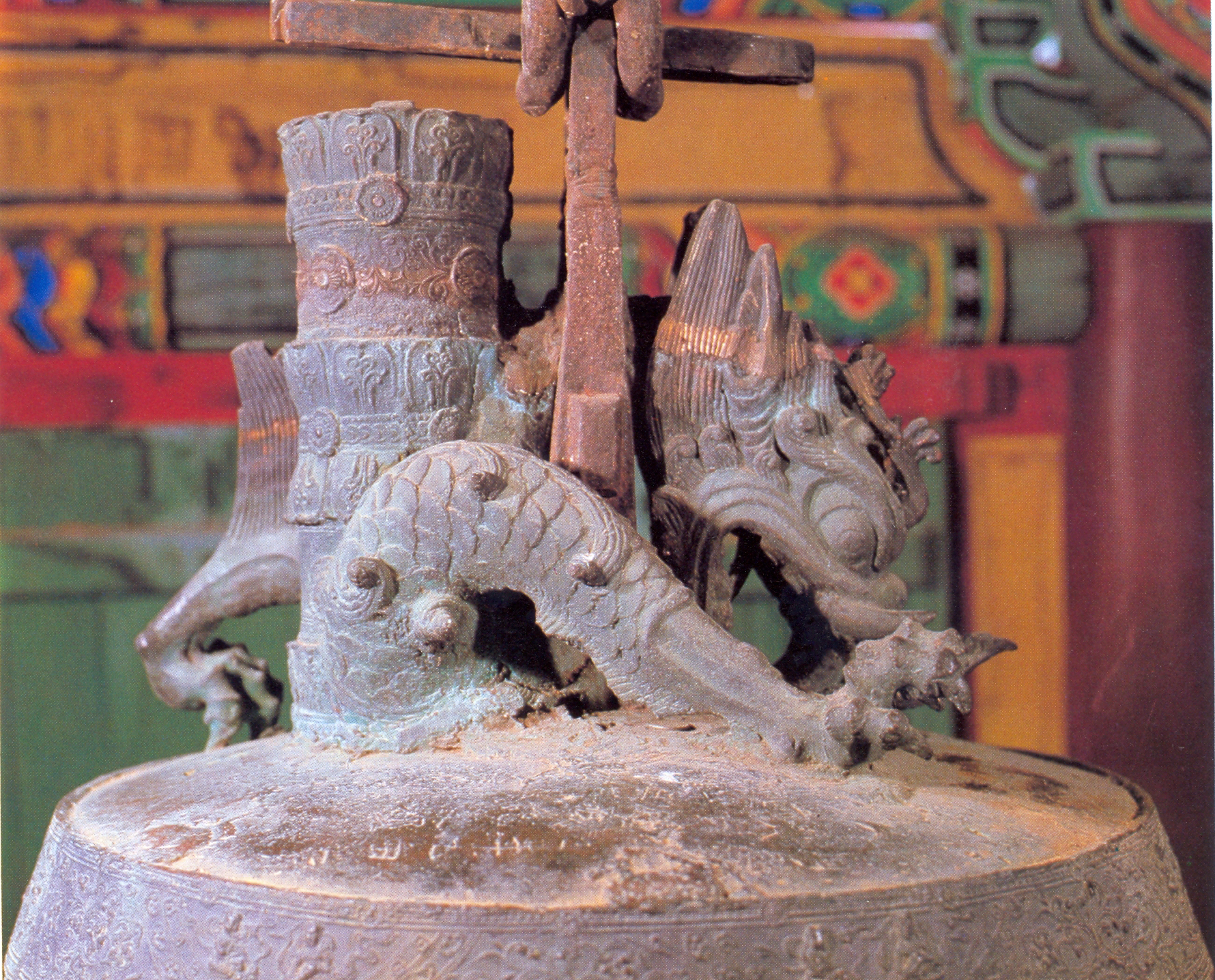

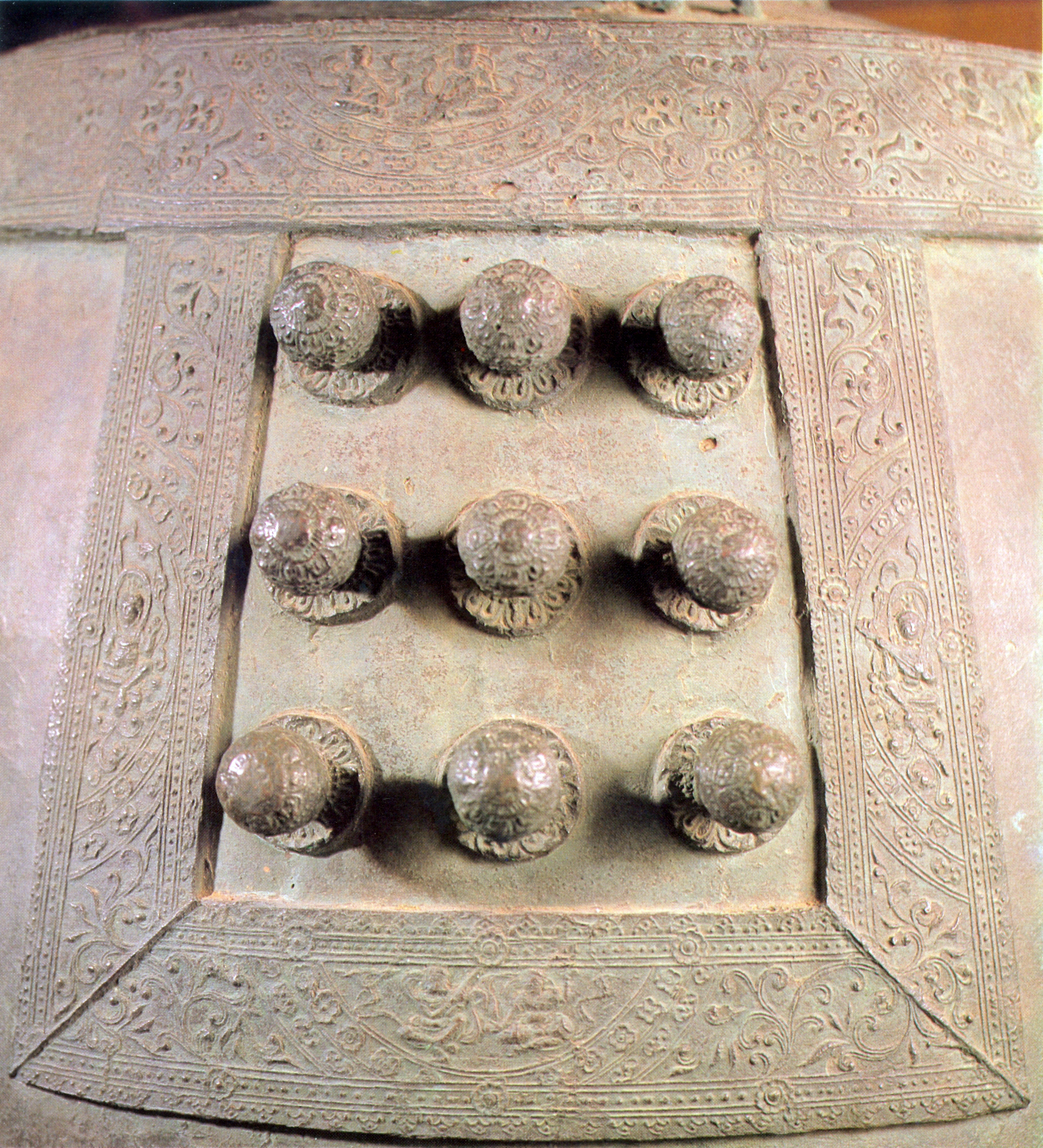

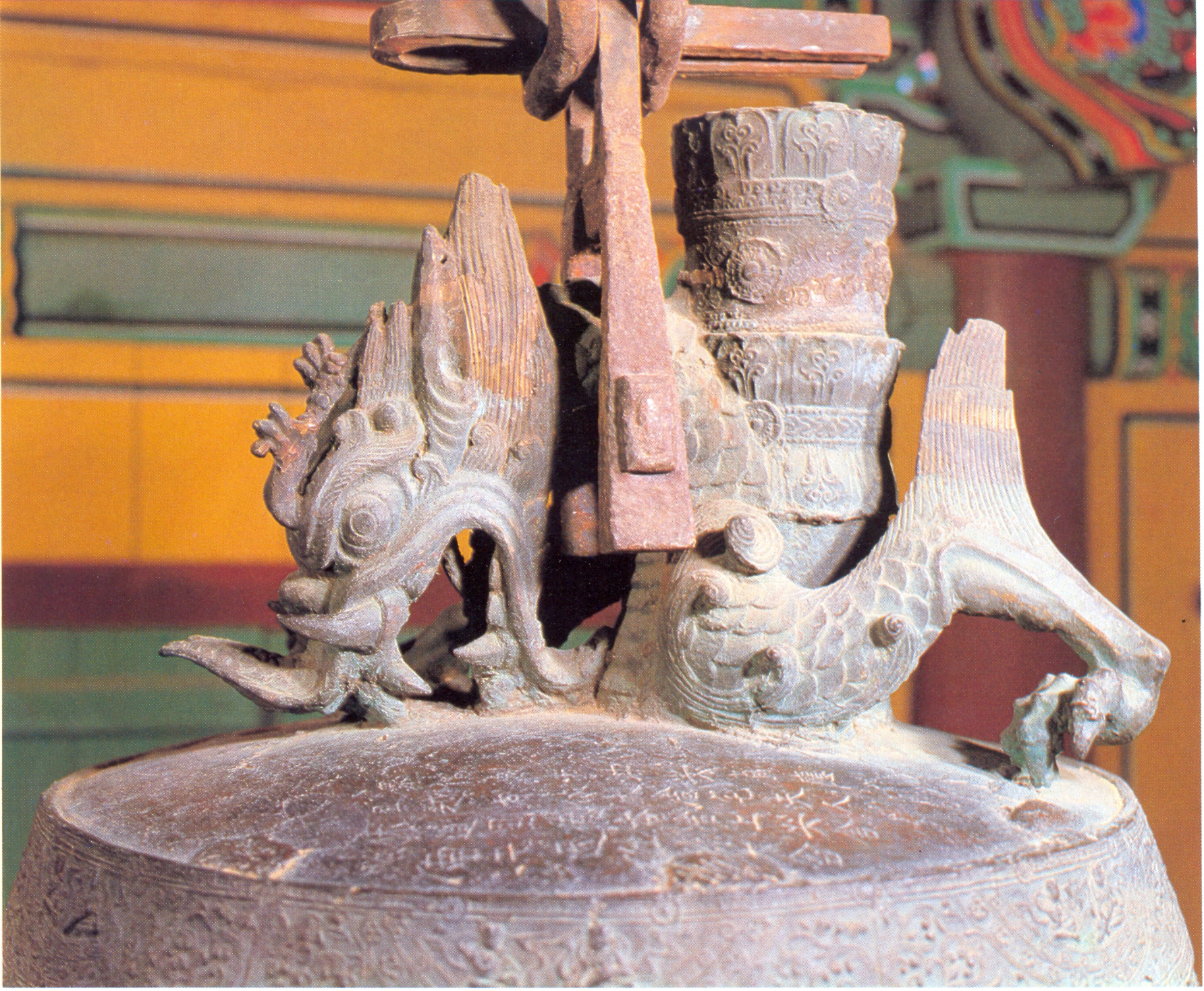

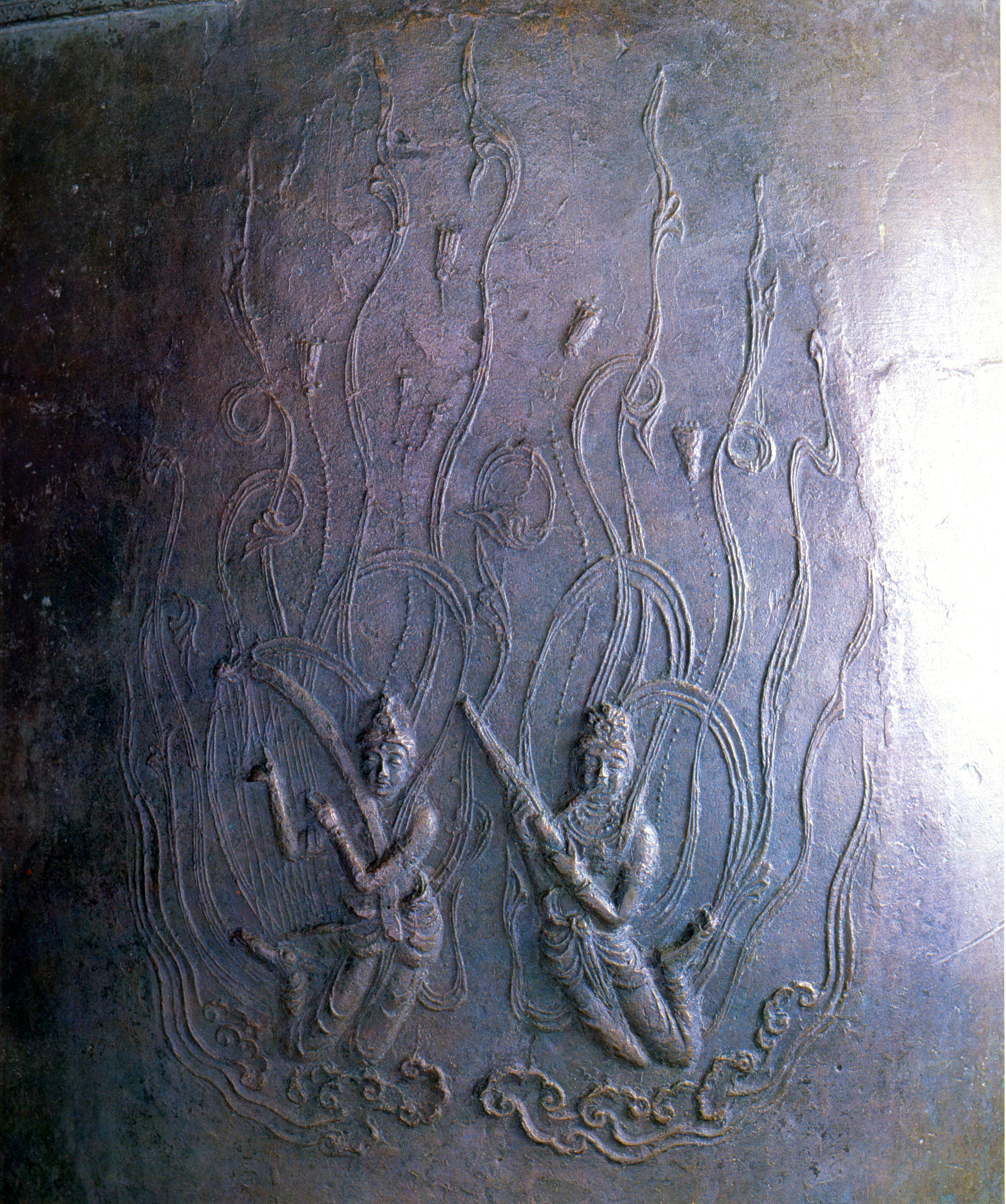

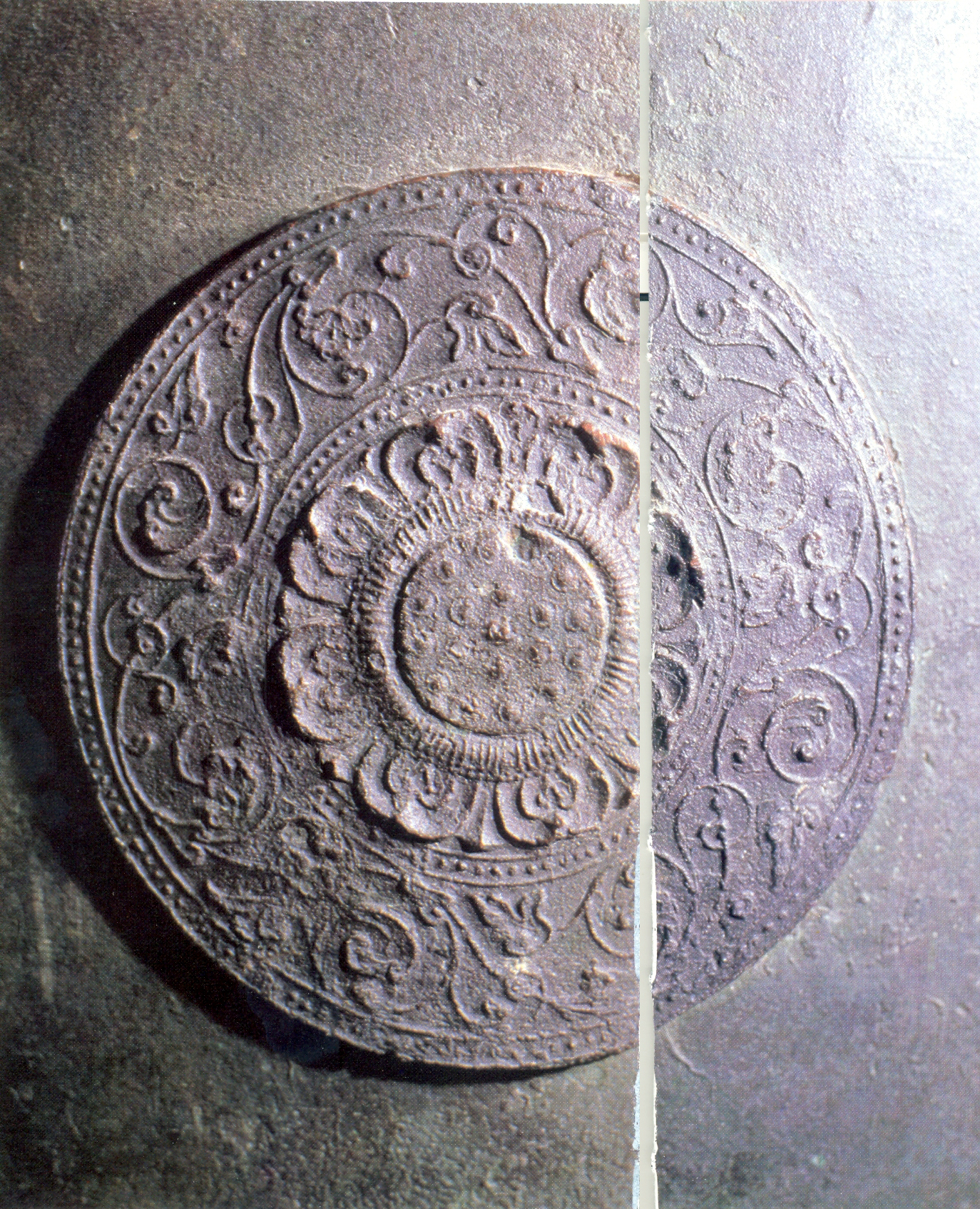

== See also ==
- Culture of Korea
- Korean Art
- Bell of King Seongdeok
- Bell of Yongjusa
- Bell of Cheonheungsa
