= Bell of Cheonheungsa =

10th century bell from Korea

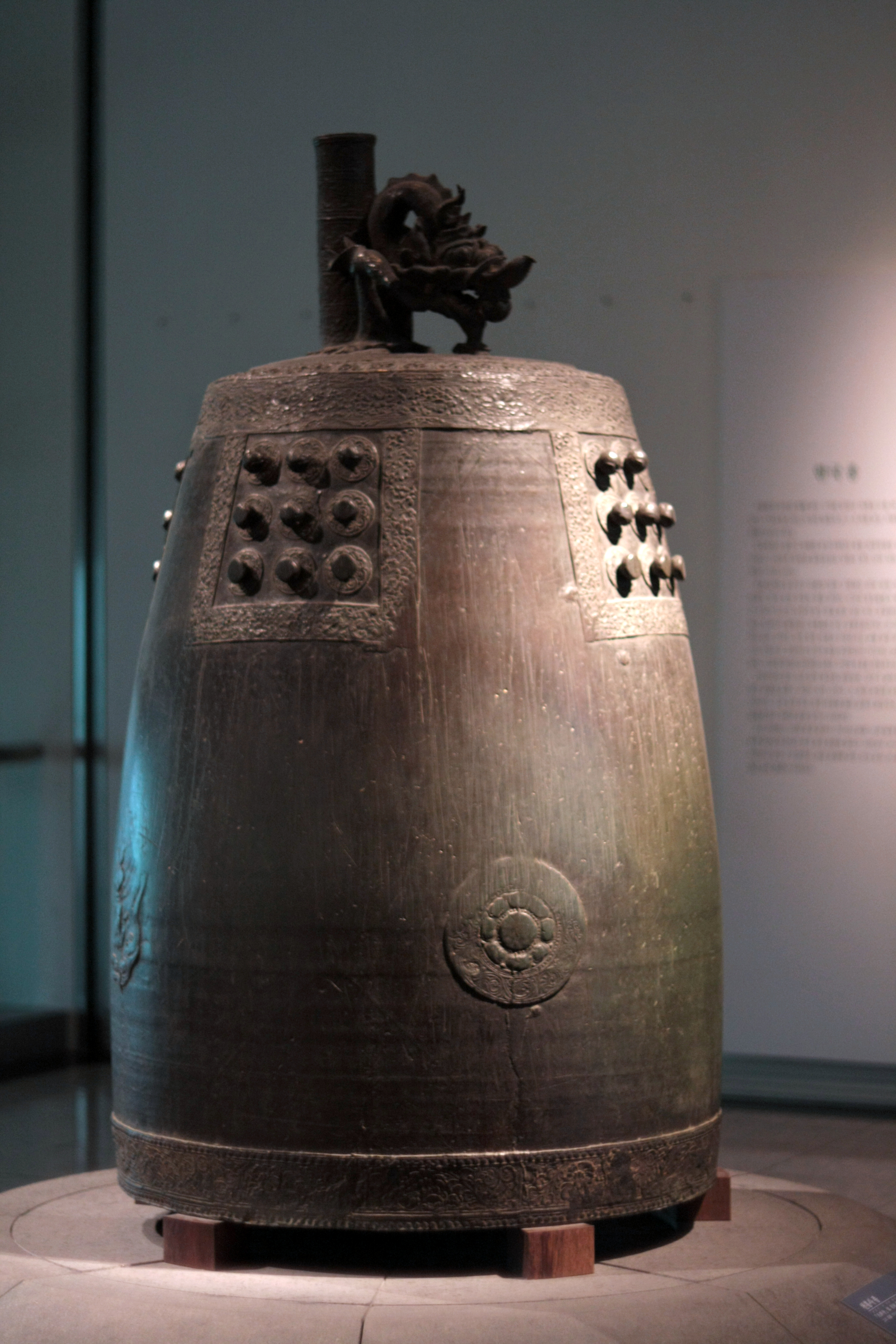

Korean name
- Hangul: 성거산 천흥사명 동종
- Hanja: 聖居山天興寺銘銅鍾
- Revised Romanization: Seonggeosan Cheonheungsamyeong Dongjong
- McCune–Reischauer: Sŏnggŏsan Ch'ŏnhŭngsamyŏng Tongchong

The Bell of Cheonheungsa is from the Cheonheungsa Temple near Seonggeo Mountain in Chungcheongnam-do Province. The Bell of Cheonheungsa is regarded as one of the largest and most beautiful bells from the Goryeo period. The bell is listed at number 280 in the "National Treasures of South Korea" list. It is made from bronze and has a height of 1.33m, with a bell inlet of 0.96m.

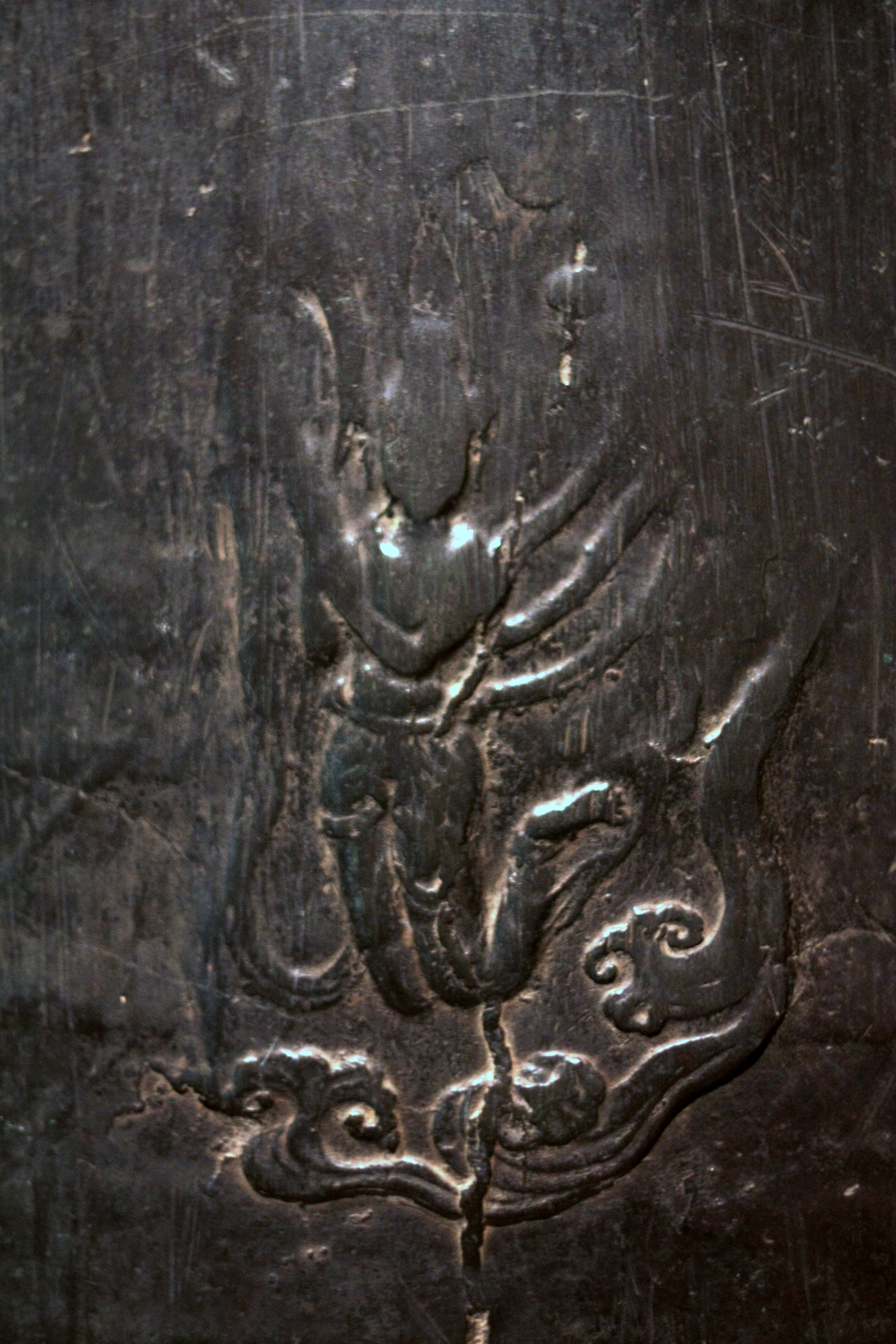

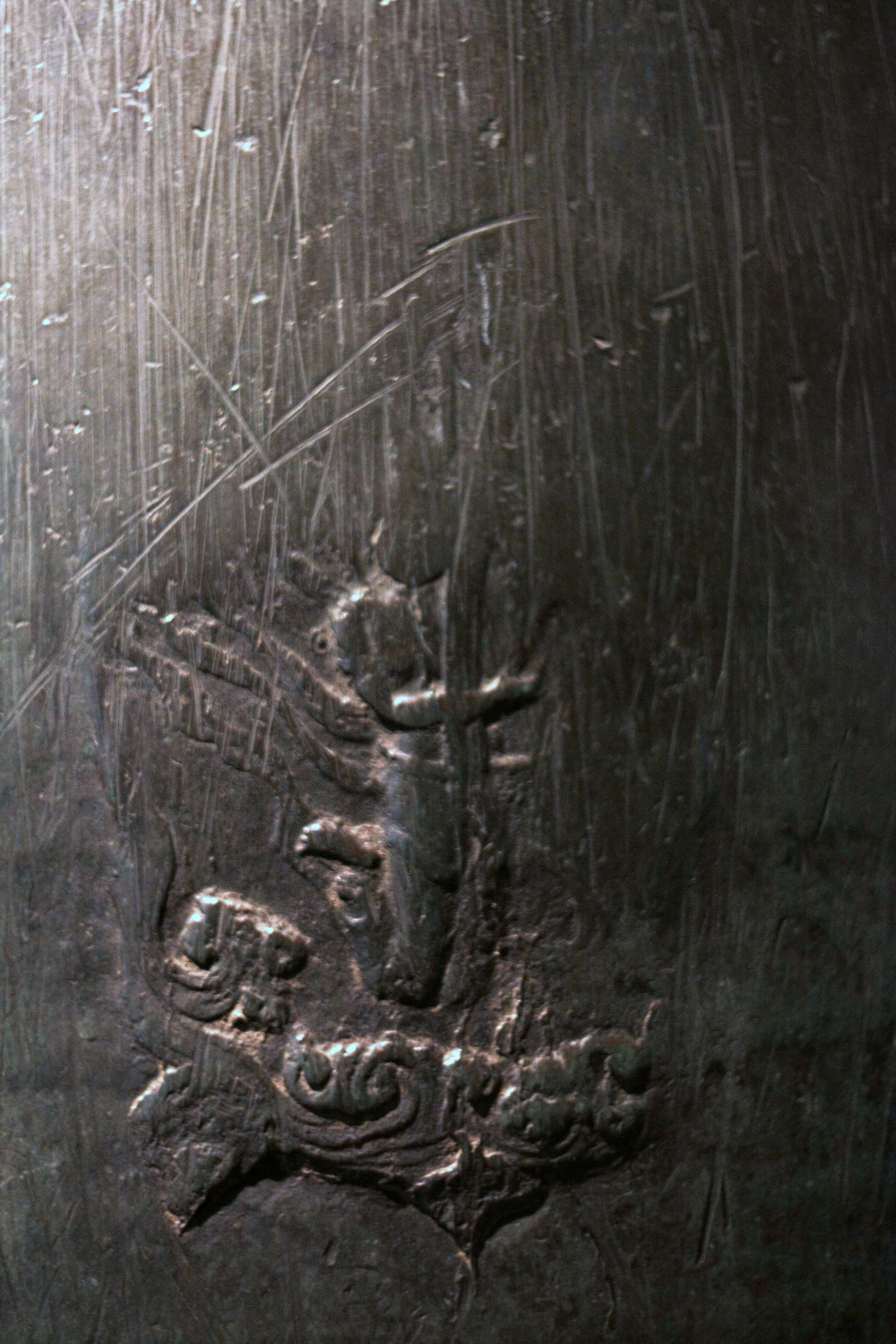

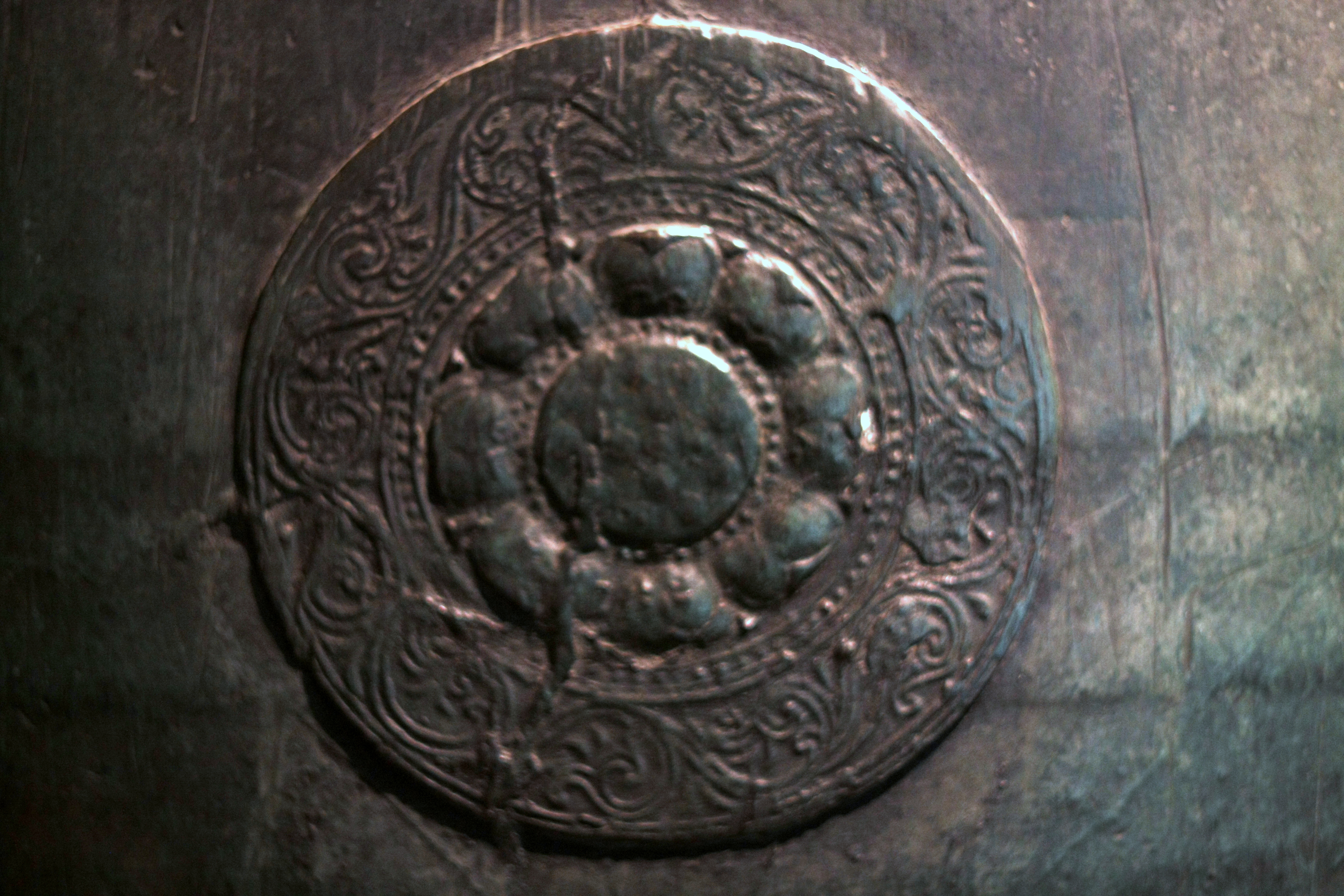

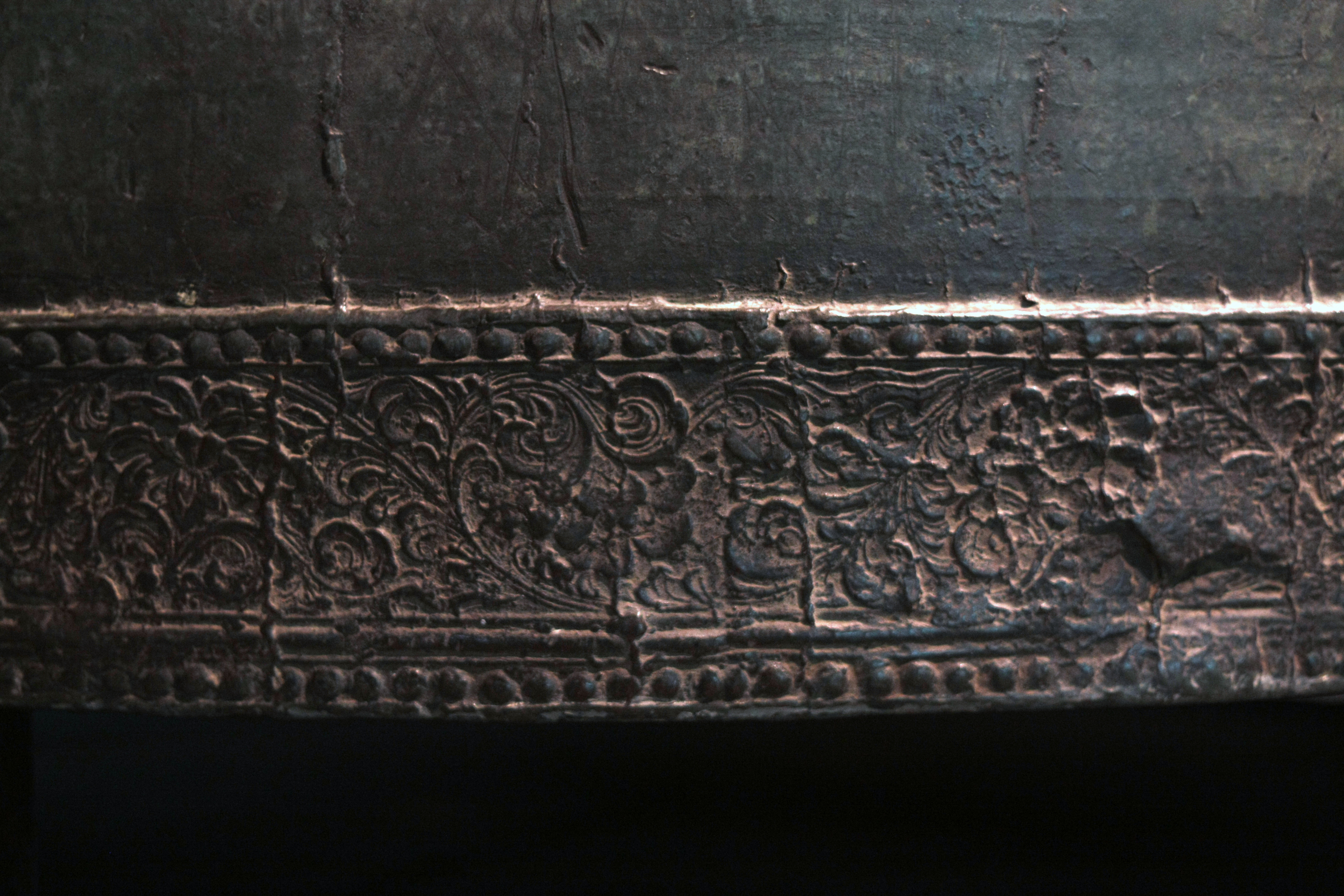

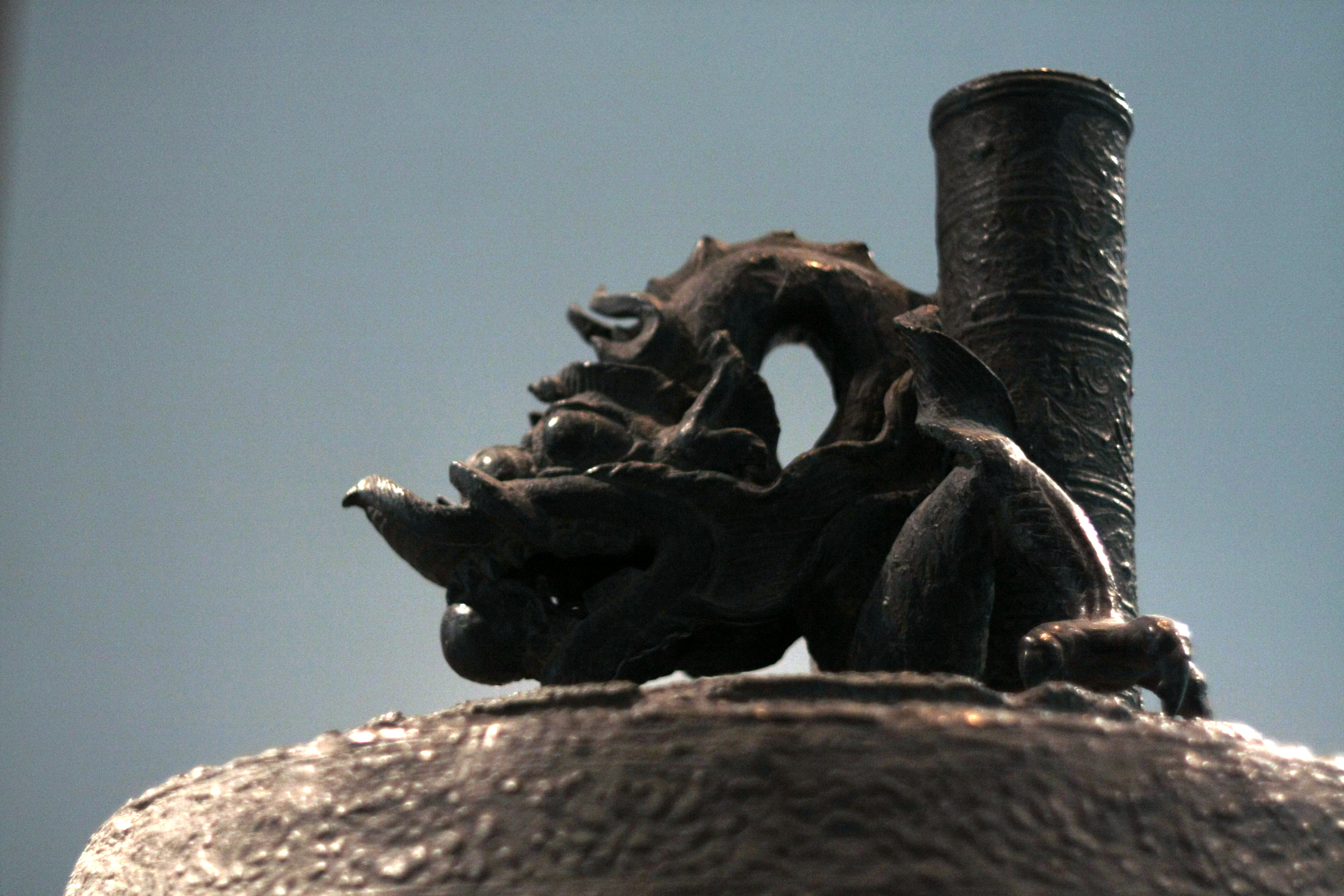

== See also ==
- Culture of Korea
- Korean Art
- Bell of King Seongdeok
- Bell of Yongjusa
- Bell of Sangwonsa
