= Wooden Seated Child Manjusri of Sangwonsa Temple =

Buddhist statue in South Korea

Wooden Seated Statue of the Child Mañjuśrī of Sangwonsa Temple
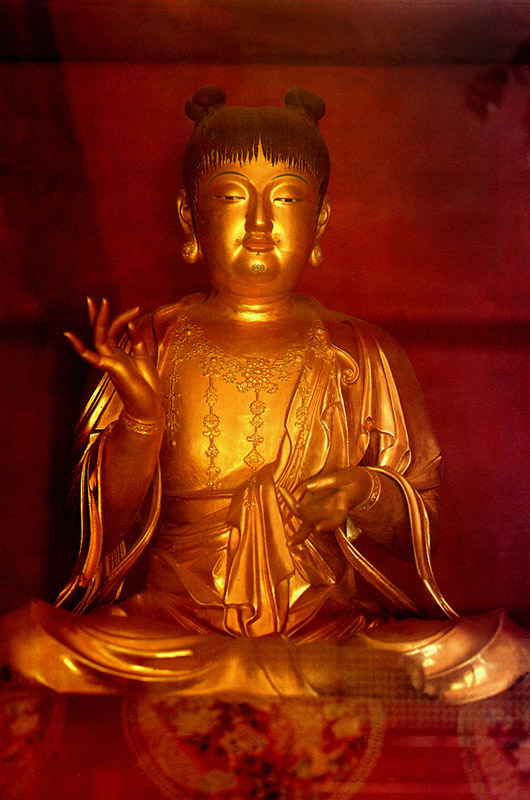
- The Wooden Seated Statue of the Child Mañjuśrī
- Artist: Unknown royal court artisans
- Year: 1466
- Type: Gilt-wood statue
- Dimensions: 98 cm (39 in)
- Location: Sangwonsa, Pyeongchang, South Korea
- Owner: Sangwonsa, Jogye Order of Korean Buddhism

The Wooden Seated Statue of the Child Mañjuśrī of Sangwonsa Temple (Korean: 상원사 목조문수동자좌상; Hanja: 上院寺 木彫文殊童子坐像) is a Korean Buddhist statue located at Sangwonsa on Mount Odae in Pyeongchang, Gangwon Province. Carved from wood and depicting the bodhisattva Mañjuśrī in the form of a child, it has been designated as as the 221st National Treasure of South Korea.

== Description ==
The wooden statue shows Mañjuśrī, the bodhisattva of wisdom in Mahāyāna Buddhism, as a seated child. It is 98 centimetres tall and was made in 1466. The child's head is slightly lowered, and his hair is tied into two knots. He has round cheeks and a gentle smile. His robes have soft folds, and a beaded necklace hangs across his chest. His right hand is raised near his shoulder, with his thumb and middle finger almost touching. He sits with his left leg folded inward and his right leg resting outward.

== Legend ==
A legend about the statue tells of King Sejo (r. 1455–1468), who suffered from a skin disease. He visited Mount Odae to pray and seek a cure. While bathing in a stream near Sangwonsa, he saw a young boy and asked him to wash his back. After the boy had washed him, Sejo told him not to tell anyone that he had washed the king's body. The boy replied that Sejo must also promise not to tell anyone that he had seen Mañjuśrī Bodhisattva. The boy then disappeared. According to the story, Sejo's illness was cured.

The story also says that Sejo later had an image of the boy made. The wooden statue at Sangwonsa is traditionally said to show the child he met. However, a written record found inside the statue names Princess Uisuk, Sejo's daughter, and her husband Jeong Hyeon-jo as the people who had it made in 1466.

== Discovery of historicl records ==
In July 1984, researchers found 23 objects inside the wooden statue. These objects, known as bokjang, included two written prayers, Buddhist texts, clothing, and other offerings.

One of the prayers dates from February 1466, the twelfth year of King Sejo's reign. It records that Sejo's daughter, Princess Uisuk, and her husband, Jeong Hyeon-jo, had Buddhist statues made for the temple. They prayed for the well-being of the royal family and hoped to have a son. The document helped establish that the child Mañjuśrī statue was made in 1466. Another prayer records repairs to the statues in 1599.

A silk jacket found inside the statue has unusual stains. Some people believe that the jacket belonged to King Sejo and that the stains came from his skin disease. This belief comes from the story of Sejo being cured after meeting Mañjuśrī. However, there is no proof that the jacket belonged to the king or that the stains are blood and pus.
