= Sangwonsa =

Buddhist temple in South Korea

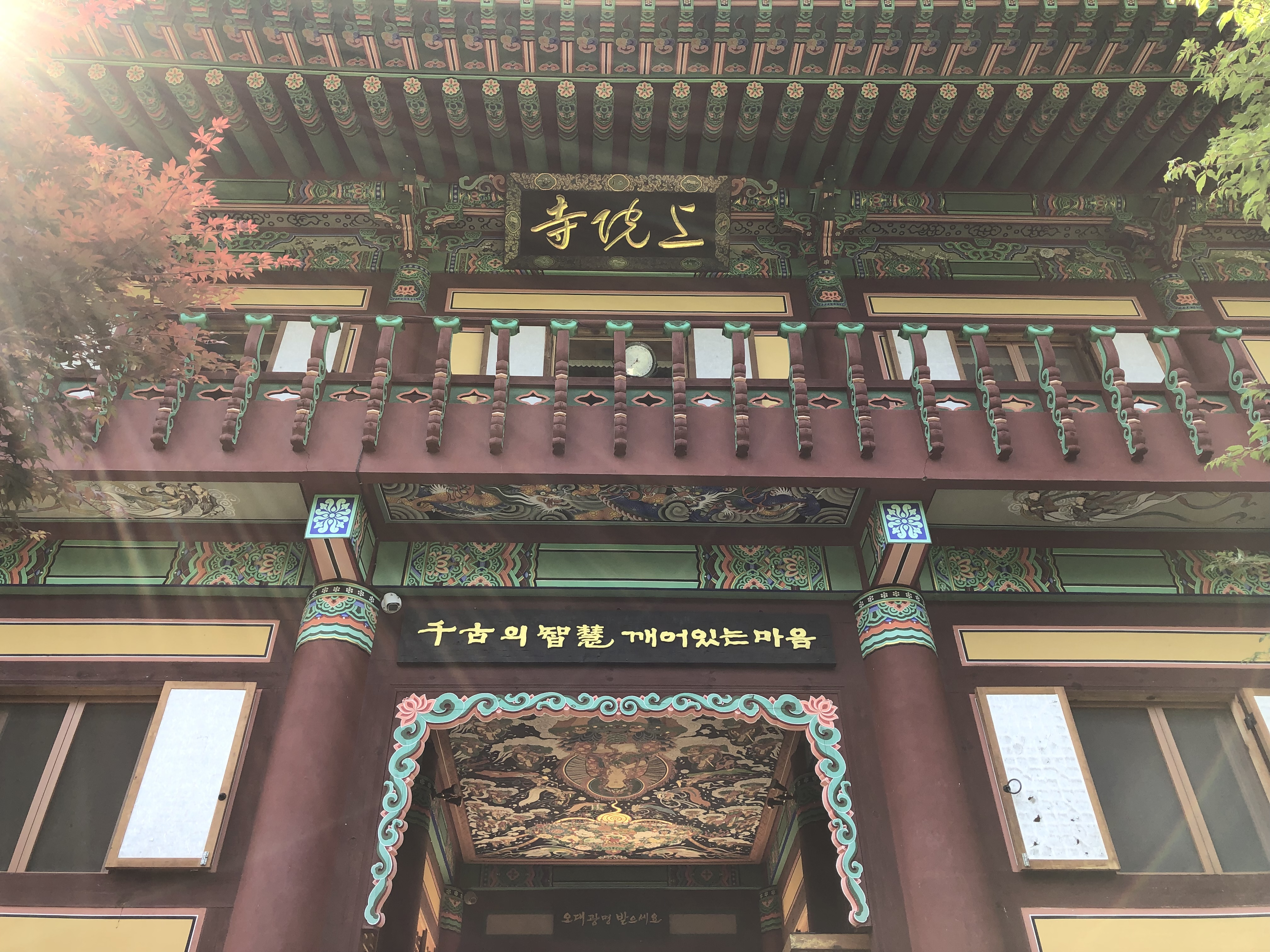
- Front door of Sangwonsa

Religion
- Affiliation: Buddhism

Location
- Location: Dongsan-ri, Jinbu-myeon, Pyeongchang County, Gangwon-do
- Country: South Korea
- Interactive map of Sangwonsa
- Coordinates: 37.7863°N 128.5639°E

Architecture
- Elevation: 938 m (3,077 ft)

Website
- woljeongsa.org

Korean name
- Hangul: 상원사
- Hanja: 上院寺
- RR: Sangwonsa
- MR: Sangwŏnsa

Sangwonsa (Korean: 상원사) is a Buddhist temple located in Pyeongchang County, Gangwon-do, South Korea. It is located within Odaesan National Park.

== History ==
The temple was first founded in 705 by two Silla-era princes, Bocheon (보천; 寶川) and Hyomyeong (효명; 孝明), in which according to the Samguk Yusa, these two princes each founded a hermitage on the spots where they saw a blue lotus blooming. Initially called Jinyeowon (진여원; 眞如院), the temple name changed to Sangwonsa during the Goryeo dynasty, when it underwent a major renovation. The temple was spared during the suppression of Buddhism of the Joseon dynasty; instead, it underwent expansion, with new buildings being built on the orders of King Taejong. King Sejo also had a deep relationship with this temple, who not only helped to renovate and expand, but also donated items such as bowls and clothing, as well as a set of Tripitaka Koreana, and even gathered monks to meditate together. Because of this, Sangwonsa enjoyed tax-exemption benefits throughout the Joseon dynasty per the will of King Sejo.

In 1946, the temple was burnt down after a fire accidentally broke out. It was rebuilt in 1947 by Lee Jong-wook (이종욱; 李鍾郁), the head priest of Woljeongsa. During the Korean War, as UN troops retreated from the north, Walton Walker and Kim Baek-il [ko], who were commanders of the U.S. 8th Army and Republic of Korea Army I Corps respectively, ordered a scorched earth policy of the area. The monk Hanam (한암; 漢巖) prevented the temple from destruction by vowing to defend it with his life, and in the end the troops decided to remove a few doors and burn them instead, to create the illusion of the temple being burned; both the monk and the officers decision had spared the loss of cultural heritage.

== Cultural Properties ==
The temple grounds contains the following:

- Bell of Sangwonsa (designated as National Treasure No. 36 in 1962)
- Sakyamuni Buddha statue
- Manjusri Bodhisattva statue
- The wooden statue of boy Manjusri [ko] (designated as National Treasure No. 793 in 1984)
- The wooden statue of Mahasthamaprapta Bodhisattva
- Yeongsanjeon Sakyamuni Triad and Sixteen Arhats [ko] (designated as Gangwon-do Tangible Cultural Property No. 162 in 2011)
- Documents of Sangwonsa Temple [ko] (designated as National Treasure No. 292 in 1997)

== See also ==
- Bell of Sangwonsa
