= Gyeongjueupseong =

Historic settlement in Gyeongju, South Korea

- Walled town
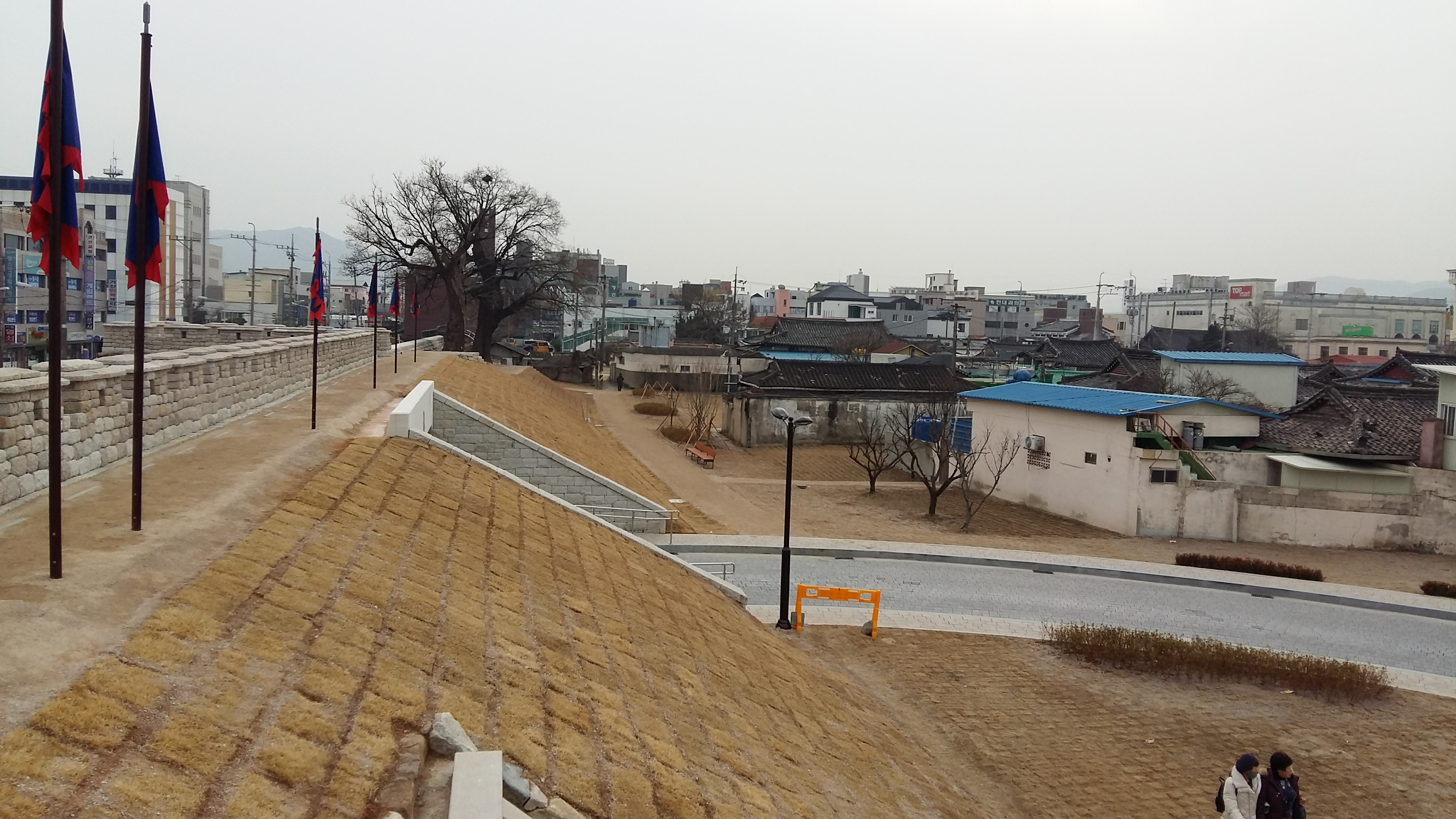
- Part of the settlement (2020)
- Interactive map of Gyeongjueupseong
- Coordinates: 35°50′47″N 129°12′49″E
- Country: South Korea
- Province: North Gyeongsang Province
- City: Gyeongju

Historic Sites of South Korea
- Designated: 1963-01-21

Korean name
- Hangul: 경주읍성
- Hanja: 慶州邑城
- RR: Gyeongjueupseong
- MR: Kyŏngjuŭpsŏng

Gyeongjueupseong (Korean: 경주읍성; Hanja: 慶州邑城), also called Gyeongju Eupseong Fortress, is a Goryeo-era walled town (eupseong) in Gyeongju, South Korea. On January 21, 1963, it was made a Historic Site of South Korea. The town was continually occupied from the Goryeo to Joseon periods. It was demolished by the Japanese colonial government in the 20th century. Beginning in the 2010s, the walled town has been gradually restored to its pre-colonial state. It has since become a tourist attraction.

== History ==
Construction began on the town in 1012 (Korean calendar), during the Goryeo period. It is not known precisely when it was completed. It began with earthen fortifications, which were later converted to stone. It was rebuilt in 1378. During the reign of Sejong the Great (r. 1418–1450) in the Joseon period, the town was possibly renovated amidst nationwide renovation projects. It was damaged during the 1592–1598 Imjin War. It was renovated soon afterwards. It continued to be occupied, renovated, and repaired until the end of the Joseon period; one such repair effort occurred in 1870.

The town's use ended during the 1910–1945 Japanese colonial period. Under orders of the Japanese colonial government, it was largely demolished. By 1933 it was mostly in ruins.

Its former site was made a Historic Site of South Korea in 1963. Excavations on it began in 1985. They continued through the 1990s and 2000s. A plan to restore the settlement was created in 2009, with annual excavation and restoration efforts conducted thereafter. The Gyeongju government purchased real estate for the project and has supported the restoration.

The bell of King Seongdeok, now in the Gyeongju National Museum, was from the gate Jingnyemun in the town.

== Gallery ==
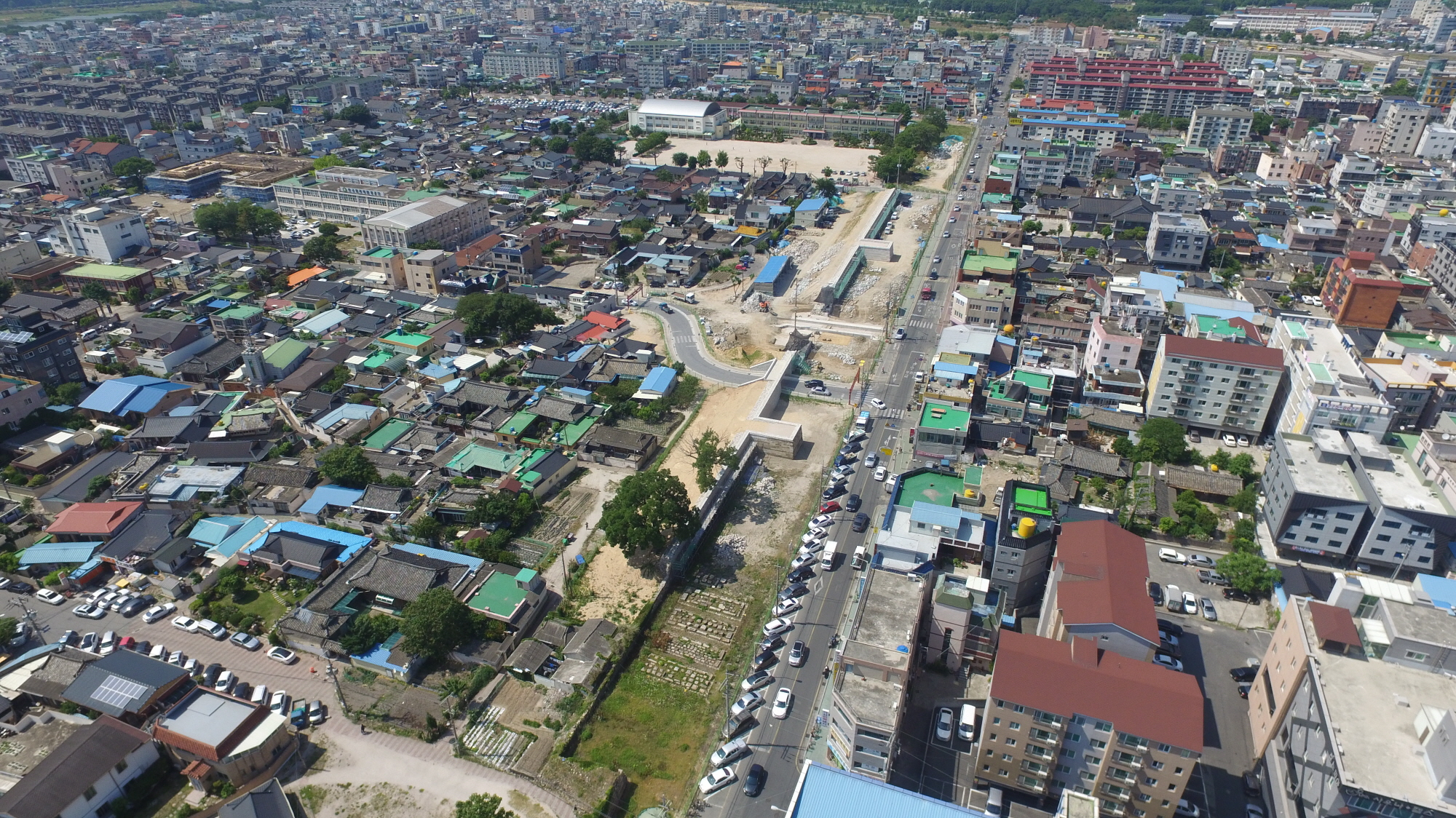
Overhead view of the reconstructed settlement (2020)

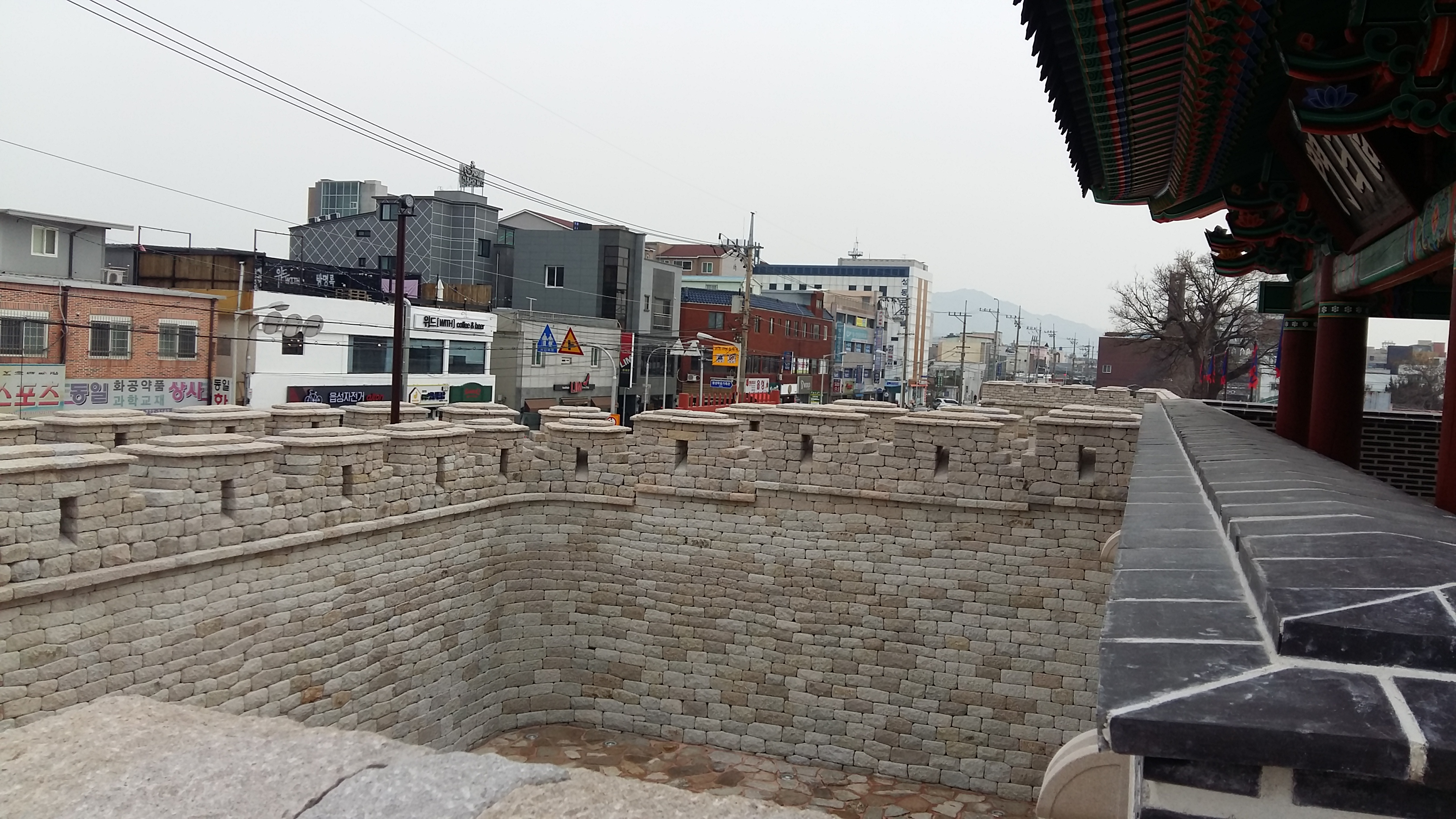
Part of the reconstructed wall (2020)

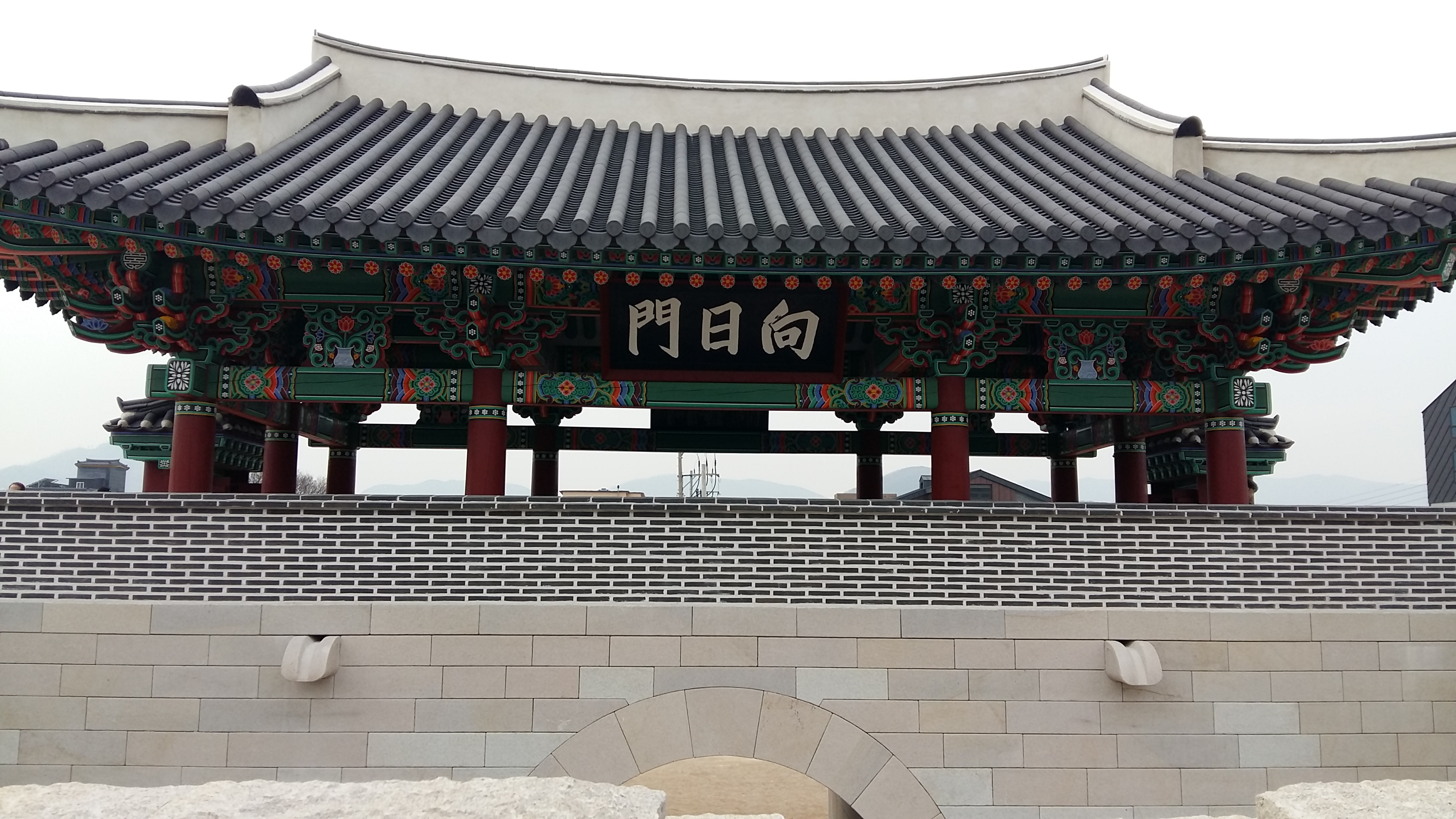
A reconstructed gate (2020)
