= Pyeongchang County =

County in Gangwon-do, South Korea

Coordinates: 37°22′N 128°24′E

Pyeongchang
- County
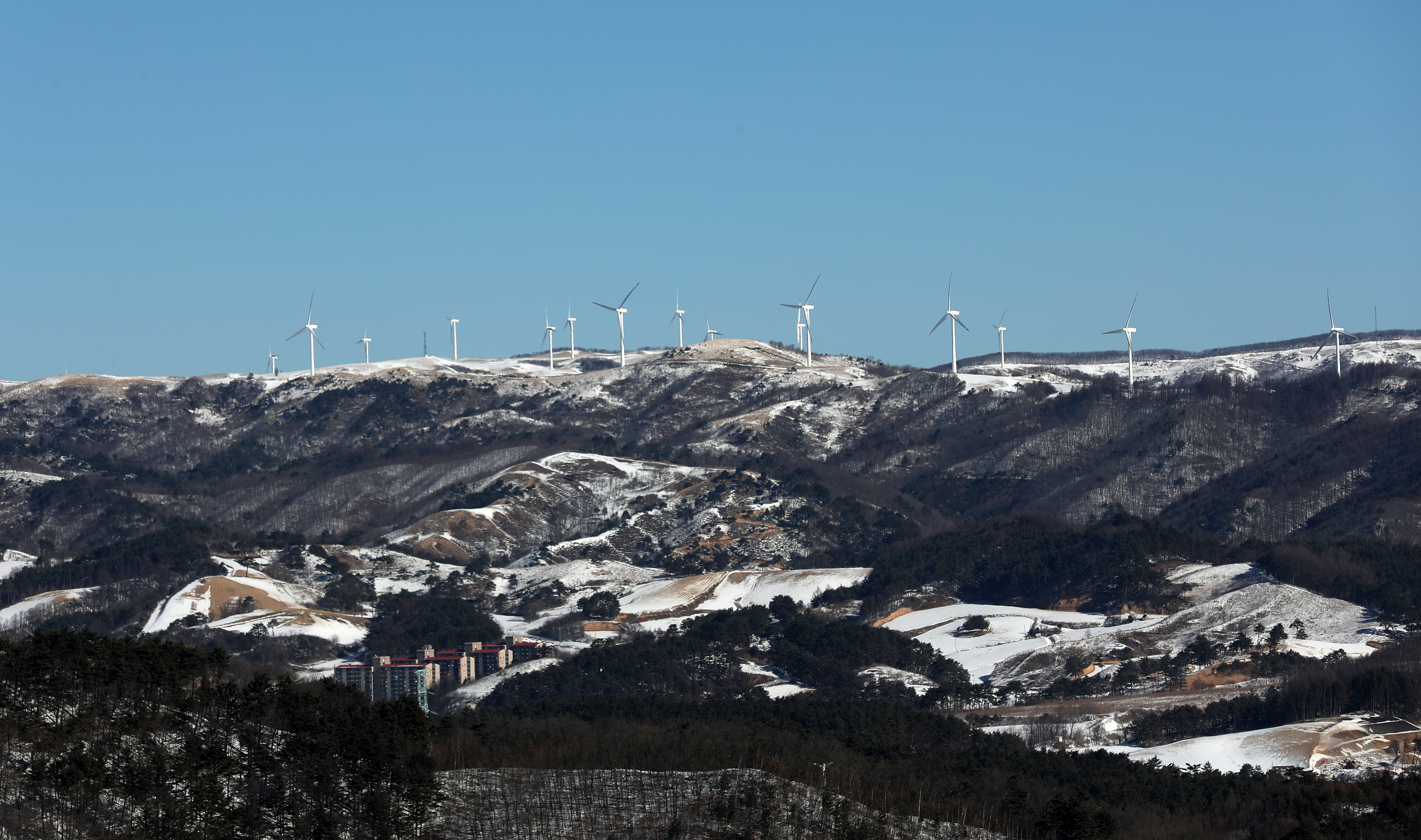
- Alpensia Resort and a wind farm in Pyeongchang

- Flag Emblem
- Etymology: 平 "peaceful" or "flatland", 昌 "prosperity" or "flourishing"
- Location in Gangwon Province, South Korea
- Country: South Korea
- State: Gangwon
- Administrative divisions: 1 eup, 7 myeon

Area
  - Total: 1,463.65 km^{2} (565.12 sq mi)

Population (September 2024)
  - Total: 40,448
  - Density: 30/km^{2} (78/sq mi)
  - Dialect: Gangwon
- Time zone: UTC+9

Korean name
- Hangul: 평창군
- Hanja: 平昌郡
- RR: Pyeongchang-gun
- MR: P'yŏngch'ang-gun

Pyeongchang (American English: /ˌpjʌŋˈtʃɑːŋ/ pyung-CHAHNG, Korean: [pʰjʌŋtɕʰaŋ]; in full, Pyeongchang-gun [pʰjʌŋtɕʰaŋɡun]) is a county in the state of Gangwon, South Korea, located in the Taebaek Mountains region. It is home to several Buddhist temples, including Woljeongsa. It is about 180 km (110 mi) east southeast of Seoul, the capital of South Korea, and connected by expressways and high-speed passenger railways. Pyeongchang's slogan, "Happy 700 Pyeongchang", is taken from its average elevation of approximately 700 metres (2,300 ft).

Pyeongchang hosted the 2018 Winter Olympics and the 2018 Winter Paralympics. It was officially rebranded as "PyeongChang" (with a capital 'C') for the purposes of the 2018 Games, in order to avoid confusion with Pyongyang in North Korea.

== History ==
Pyeongchang region was ruled by the Goguryeo Dynasty during the Three Kingdoms period, and it was called Uk-o-hyeon (욱오현). After the Silla dynasty conquered the Goguryeo Dynasty and Baekje Dynasty, it was renamed Baek-o-hyeon (백오현).

After the Goryeo Dynasty was established, it renamed Pyeongchang-hyeon. Then, it was under control of Wonju. When a 10-provincial system was enforced, the north of Pyeongchang region was involved in Sakbang-do, and the south of the region was involved in Jungwon-do. When a new administrative system was carried out by King Hyeonjong, the east of the region was involved in Dong-gyeo, and the rest of it was included in Yanggwang-do. An administrator for the region was sent from the central government, and it became independent of Wonju in 1299.

When the Joseon Dynasty was founded in 1392, the region was promoted from a hyeon to a county (gun). After the territory was divided into 8 Provinces under the reign of King Taejong, it was involved in Gangwon-do. After the territory was divided into 23 districts in 1895 with the 8-provincial system abolished, it was included in Chugju-bu. When a 13-provincial system was enacted in 1896, it was involved in Gangwon-do.

== Geography ==
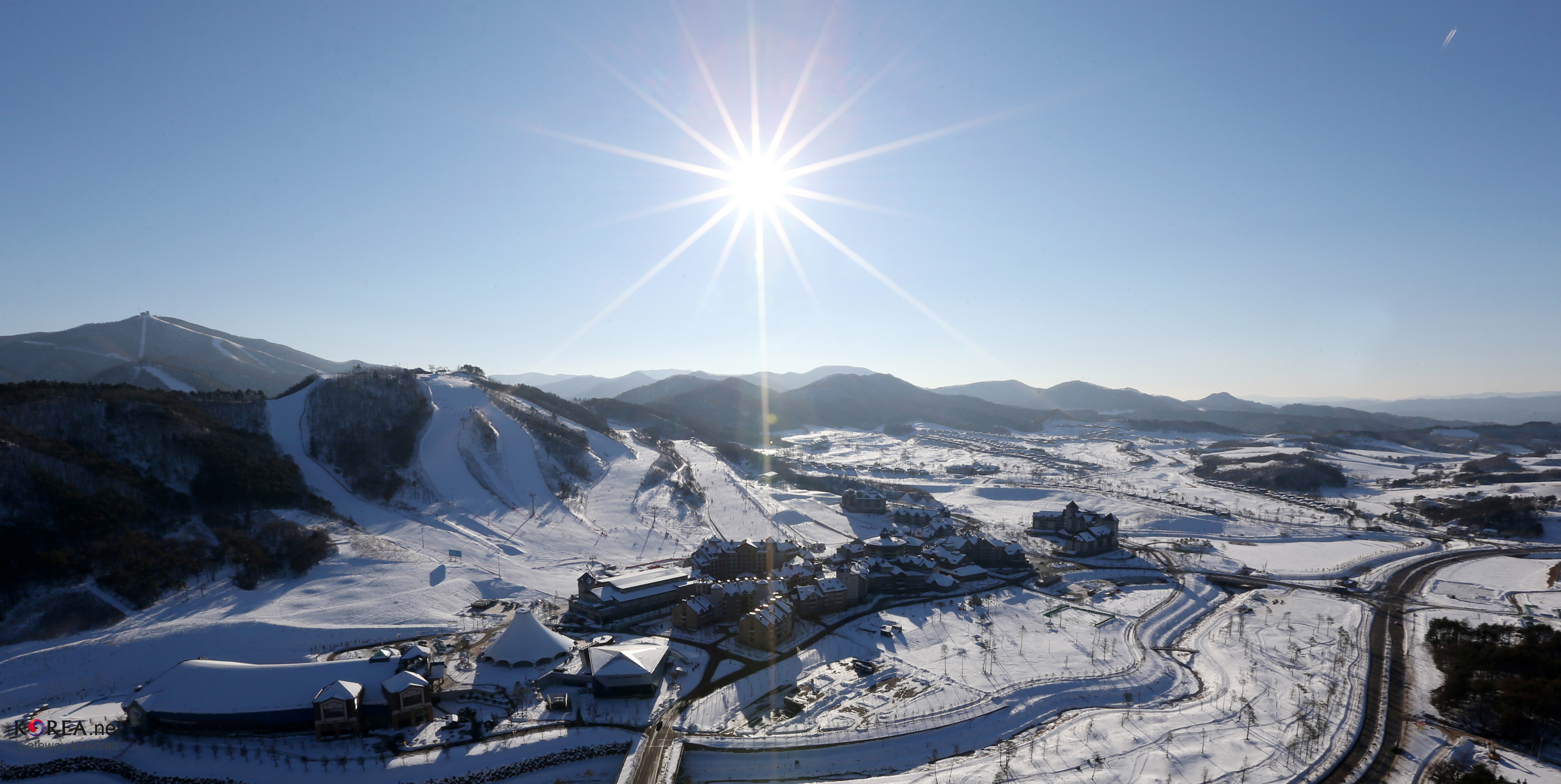
Pyeongchang, Gangwon – winter is cold but relatively dry, with clear blue skies.

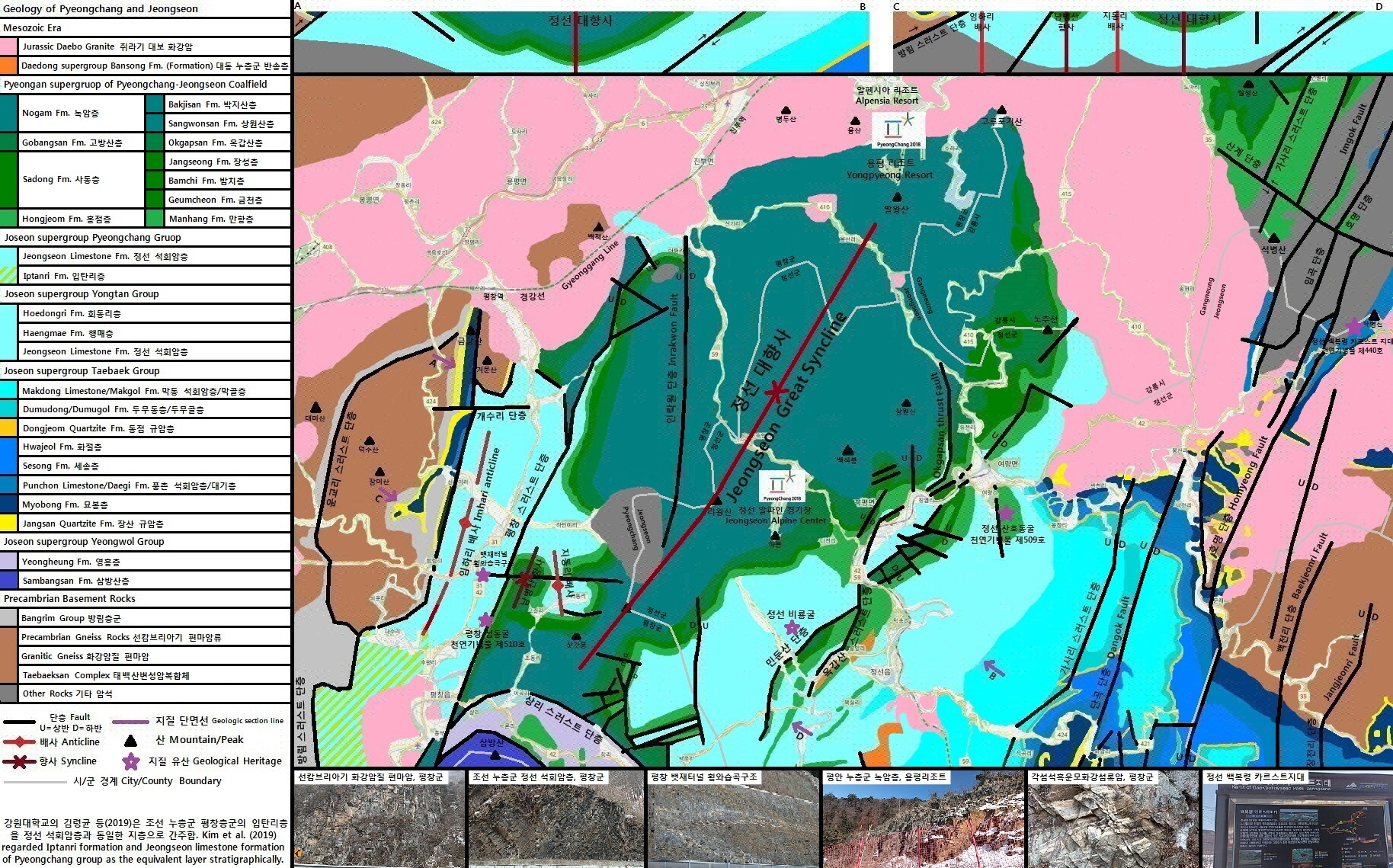
Geology of Pyeongchang and Jeongseon area.

The altitude of Pyeongchang is wide-ranging, with 84% of its territory comprising mountains with average elevations of 750 m (2,460 ft).

Its best-known place, the township of Daegwallyeong-myeon, averages between 700 and 800 m (2,300 and 2,600 ft) above sea level, with some areas over 1,000 m (3,300 ft) high.

=== Climate ===
Under the Köppen climate classification, Pyeongchang County experiences a warm-summer humid continental climate (Dwb). Pyeongchang's winters are long and very snowy, while summers are relatively short.

Average temperature of Pyeongchang from 2001 to 2010 was 7.1 °C, and it was lower than Gangwon's 9.0 °C. Annual precipitation of the region from 2001 to 2010 was 1,555.0 mm, and it was more than Gangwon's 1,491.5 mm.

The warmest months of the year are July and August, with January and February being the coldest.

Climate data for Daegwallyeong, Pyeongchang (1991–2020 normals, extremes 1971–present)
Month	Jan	Feb	Mar	Apr	May	Jun	Jul	Aug	Sep	Oct	Nov	Dec	Year
Record high °C (°F)	9.3 (48.7)	16.5 (61.7)	20.5 (68.9)	30.1 (86.2)	31.0 (87.8)	32.3 (90.1)	32.9 (91.2)	32.7 (90.9)	29.0 (84.2)	26.1 (79.0)	21.5 (70.7)	13.5 (56.3)	32.9 (91.2)
Mean daily maximum °C (°F)	−1.8 (28.8)	0.6 (33.1)	5.5 (41.9)	12.9 (55.2)	18.4 (65.1)	21.3 (70.3)	23.4 (74.1)	23.6 (74.5)	19.4 (66.9)	14.6 (58.3)	7.5 (45.5)	0.5 (32.9)	12.2 (54.0)
Daily mean °C (°F)	−7.0 (19.4)	−4.6 (23.7)	0.4 (32.7)	7.0 (44.6)	12.5 (54.5)	16.2 (61.2)	19.6 (67.3)	19.7 (67.5)	14.6 (58.3)	8.8 (47.8)	2.3 (36.1)	−4.5 (23.9)	7.1 (44.8)
Mean daily minimum °C (°F)	−12.2 (10.0)	−10.1 (13.8)	−4.7 (23.5)	1.2 (34.2)	6.8 (44.2)	11.6 (52.9)	16.6 (61.9)	16.5 (61.7)	10.4 (50.7)	3.5 (38.3)	−2.6 (27.3)	−9.4 (15.1)	2.3 (36.1)
Record low °C (°F)	−28.9 (−20.0)	−27.6 (−17.7)	−23.0 (−9.4)	−14.6 (5.7)	−4.7 (23.5)	−1.7 (28.9)	4.4 (39.9)	3.3 (37.9)	−2.3 (27.9)	−9.9 (14.2)	−18.7 (−1.7)	−24.7 (−12.5)	−28.9 (−20.0)
Average precipitation mm (inches)	53.1 (2.09)	49.2 (1.94)	72.6 (2.86)	93.5 (3.68)	108.2 (4.26)	162.5 (6.40)	336.3 (13.24)	368.4 (14.50)	249.6 (9.83)	97.6 (3.84)	69.4 (2.73)	34.7 (1.37)	1,695.1 (66.74)
Average precipitation days (≥ 0.1 mm)	9.4	8.9	11.2	10.4	10.8	12.9	17.8	18.1	13.1	8.9	10.2	8.5	140.2
Average snowy days	13.0	11.8	12.0	3.3	0.2	0.0	0.0	0.0	0.0	0.8	5.2	10.9	57.2
Average relative humidity (%)	66.3	65.7	65.8	61.9	67.5	79.4	86.2	87.2	85.5	76.8	70.3	66.6	73.3
Mean monthly sunshine hours	199.3	193.5	210.9	223.1	237.2	192.4	143.0	138.2	149.6	196.2	177.2	193.3	2,253.9
Percentage possible sunshine	64.4	60.8	54.6	57.4	52.1	40.7	30.8	31.0	38.6	55.5	57.8	64.3	49.3
Source: Korea Meteorological Administration (snow and percent sunshine 1981–2010)

== Culture and tourism ==
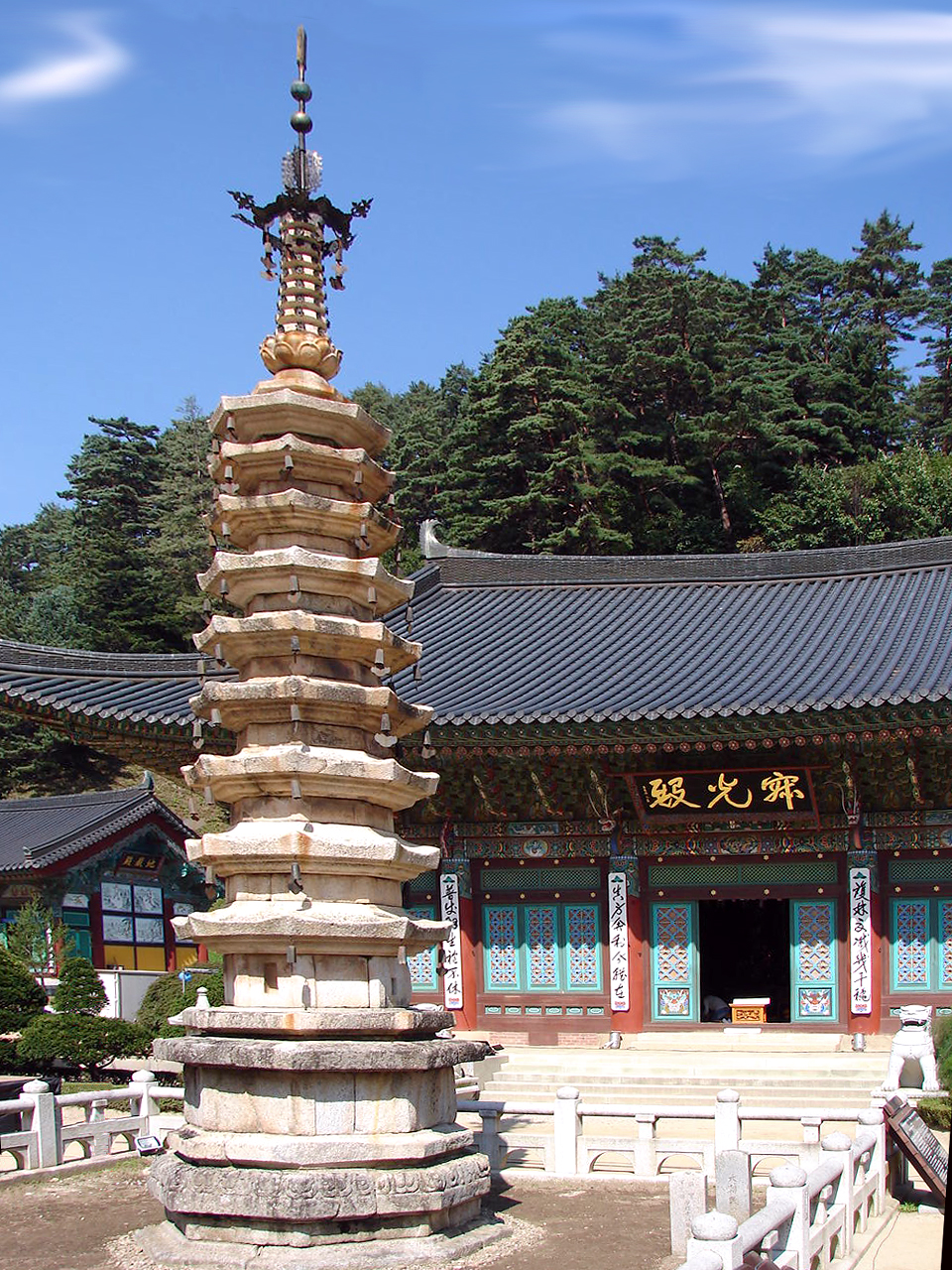
Woljeongsa Nine Story Stone Pagoda

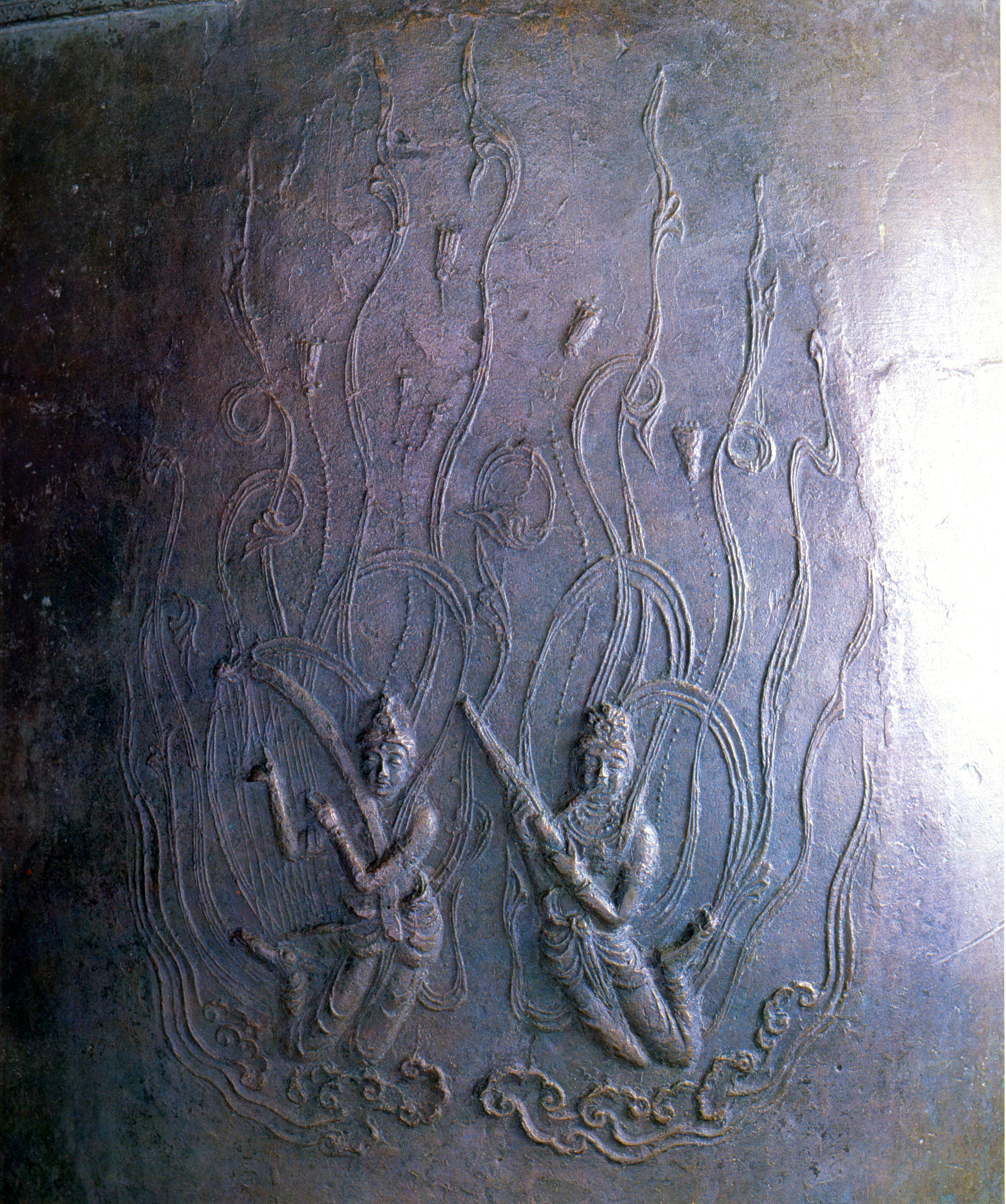
A part of the Bell of Sangwonsa

=== Cultural heritage sites ===
In Pyeongchang, 16 heritage sites were registered by the South Korean government, and 45 Heritages were registered by the Gangwon Provincial Office.

The count of cultural heritage designations is as follows.

- Registered by the Nation: 5 National Treasures, 5 Treasures, 1 Historic Site, 3 Natural Monuments, 1 National Folklore Cultural Heritage, 1 Registered Cultural Heritage
- Registered by the local government: 29 Tangible Cultural Heritages, 2 Intangible Cultural Heritages, 4 Monuments, 10 Cultural Heritage Materials

==== Temples ====
Sangwonsa is a temple on Odaesan Mountain that was originally established as Jinyeowon in 705. Although the Joseon Dynasty's policy was the prohibition of Buddhism, it constantly donated to rebuild the temple. In 1401, King Taejong donated to the construction of Sajaam Hermitage. In 1465, King Sejo and administrators donated to rebuild the temple. Sejo's son, King Yejong designated it as a memorial for his father. During the Third Battle of Seoul, the United Nations Command ordered that the temple be burned, but a Buddhist monk prevented it. Instead, the Command agreed to burn only the doors of the temple.

Sangwonsa has the following cultural heritage sites:

- The Bell of Sangwonsa (National Treasure No. 36)
- Promotion of Virtue for Rebuilding Sangwonsa (National Treasure No. 292)
- Wooden Seated Child Manjusri of Sangwonsa Temple (National Treasure No. 221)
  - Wooden seated figure of the Manjusri Child's Enshrined Heritages in Sangwonsa (Treasure No. 793)
- Wooden seated figure of Manjusri and its Enshrined Heritages in Sangwonsa (Treasure No. 1811)
  - Wooden sedentary figure of Manjusri's Enshrined Classical Kooks in Sangwonsa (Treasure No. 1812)

Woljeongsa is a temple on Odaesan Mountain established by Jajang the monk in 643. After it was established, it was consistently rebuilt. During the Third Battle of Seoul, 10 buildings were totally destroyed by fire. Tanheo the monk restored Jeokgwangjeon, one of the burnt buildings, in 1964, and Manhwa the monk gradually reconstructed other buildings.

Woljeongsa has the following cultural heritage sites:

- Octagonal Nine-story Stone Pagoda of Woljeongsa (National Treasure No. 48-1)
  - Reliquaries of the Octagonal Nine-story Stone Pagoda of Woljeongsa (Treasure No. 1375)
- Stone seated figure of the Bodhisattva in Woljeongsa (National Treasure No. 48-2)
- Painting of Three Bodhisattvas originated from Wonju Guryongsa (Treasure No. 1855) (Placed in Wolljeongsa, possessed by Guryongsa)
- Clothes of the Buddhist monk Han-am (Registered Cultural Heritage No. 645)

==== Historic sites ====
The Pyeongchang Odaesan Historic Archive (Historic Site No. 34) was one of five archival locations in the latter part of the Joseon Dynasty for the Annals of the Joseon Dynasty and Sonwon-kyebo-kiryak.

=== Festivals ===
- Daegwallyeong Snow Festival

Daegwallyeong Snow Festival began as "Daegwallyeong Winter Snow Festival" in 1992 by Daegwallyeong Ski Club. In 1993, the first festival was formally held. Events of the 1st festival were skiing competition for locals, games of making snowmen, snow sledge competition, and sledge competition. Some games were added to next festivals, such as traditional games and snow car raising.
On 7–22 Feb 2018, 26th festival was held in hwenggye-ri, Daegwallyeong-myeon as a pre-event of the 2018 Winter Olympics. Events include an exhibition of snow figures, snow sledge competition, international naked marathon, traditional folk performances, and Hwangbyoungsan Mountain hunting game.

- Hyoseok Cultural Festival

Pyeongchang is the hometown of Lee Hyo-seok, a Korean novelist, and this festival is held in Lee Hyo-seok Culture Village, where he grew up.

=== Museum ===
- Lee Seung-bok Memorial Hall

The Lee Seung-bok Memorial Hall is located in Nodong-ri, Yongpyeong-myeon to memorialize Lee Seung-bok who was a South Korean boy murdered by North Korean commandos in 1968. It was established in 1982, with building a memorial statue for Lee. Lee's house was restored in 2000.

=== Food ===
Characteristic foods are buckwheat dishes, grilled hwangtae, Daegwallyeong hanwoo, osambulgogi, maeuntang, trout hoe, and wild herbs.

=== Nature and sports ===
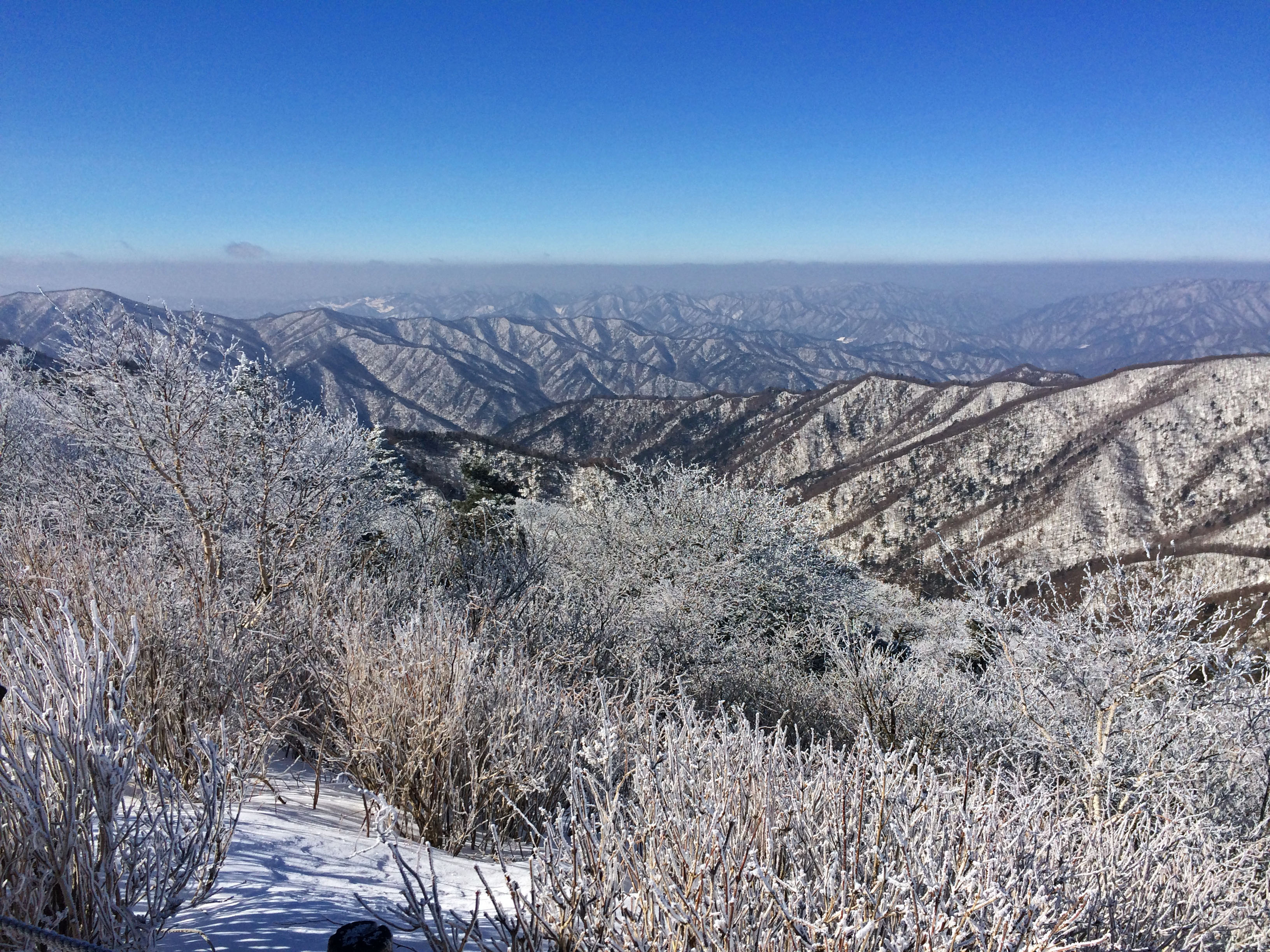
A snowscape of Odaesan National Park

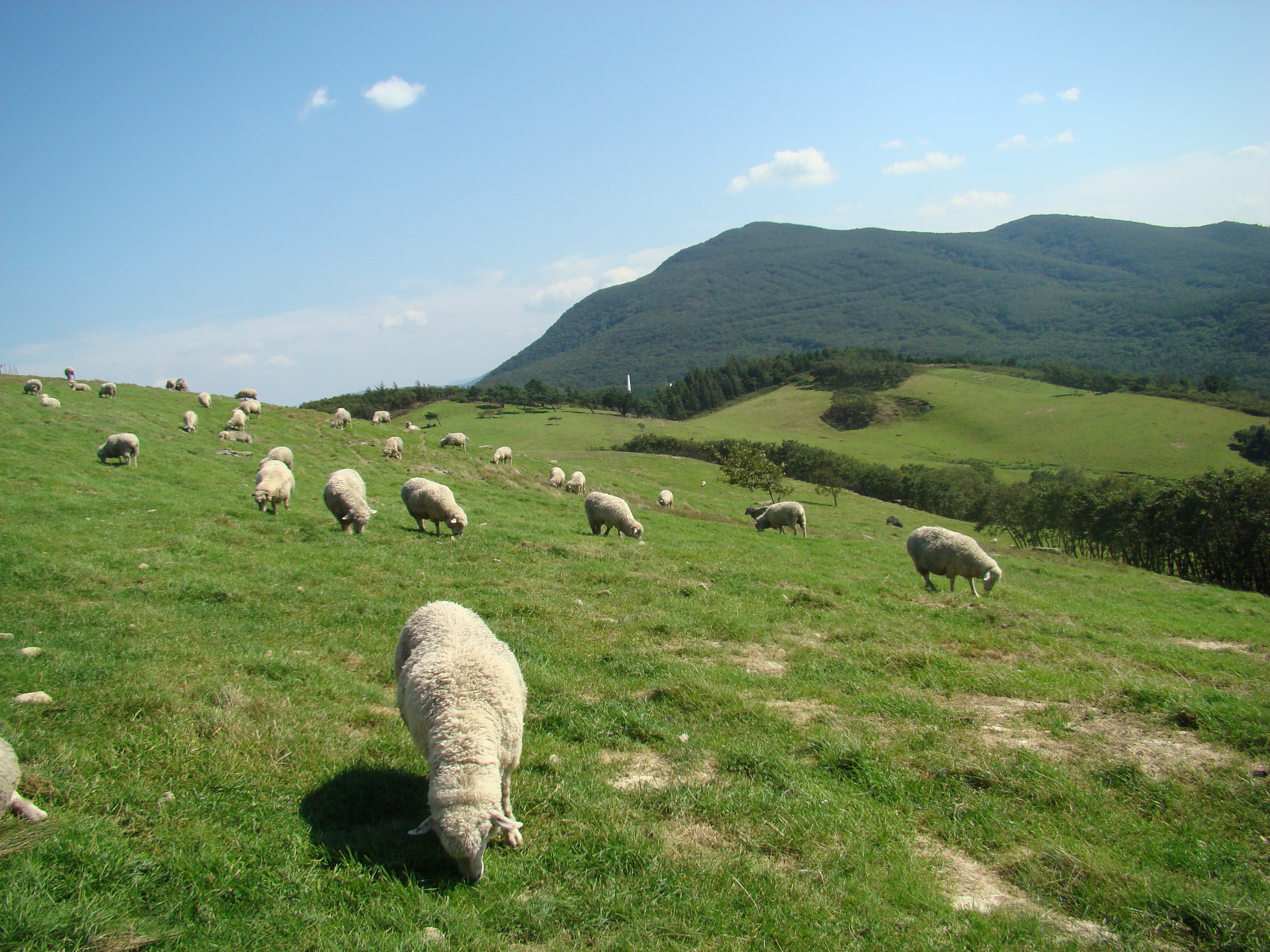
Daegwallyeong Sheep Farm

Odaesan Mountain is the home of historical Buddhist temples including Sangwonsa and Woljeongsa. It was designated as a national park in 1975. The highest peak, Birobong Peak is 1,563 m (5,128 ft) high.

Two major ski resorts in the county were the home of the 2018 Winter Olympics. Alpensia ski resort has six slopes for skiing and snowboarding, with runs up to 1,400.0 m (4,593.2 ft) long, for beginners and advanced skiers, and an area reserved for snowboarders. The resort is open year-round. Alpensia hosted the majority of the Olympic snow events. Yongpyong Resort, which has a total of 28 ski slopes, hosted the technical alpine skiing events.

Alpensia will be the focus of the 2018 Cultural Olympiad, with a new, purpose-built concert hall within the resort with an indoor water park.

Samyang Ranch is the largest highlands farm in Asia, located in the hills of Daegwallyeong at 850 to 1,470 meters above sea level. It is operated as a petting zoo and features a pastoral landscape. The ranch is operated by the leading Korean food and dairy company Samyang Foods, the first company to introduce ramyeon instant noodles into a poverty-ridden South Korea in the 1960s. It is the filming location of the drama Autumn in My Heart and the movie Lover's Concerto.

== Sport ==
Pyeongchang hosted the 1999 Asian Winter Games and 2013 Special Olympics World Winter Games. The 2018 Winter Olympics were also held in Pyeongchang, as well as the 2009 IBU Biathlon World Championships.

=== 1999 Asian Winter Games ===
The Asian Winter Games was held in 1999 in Gangwon Province including Pyeongchang. Originally, it hoped to host the 3rd Asian Winter Games, which North Korea gave up; however, Harbin was announced to host the 3rd Games. It was decided that Gangwon would host the 4th Asian Winter Games at the same time.

In total, 799 athletes participated in the Games. Alpine skiing, cross-country skiing, biathlon, short track speed skating, and figure skating events were held in Pyeongchang.

=== 2018 Winter Olympic Games ===
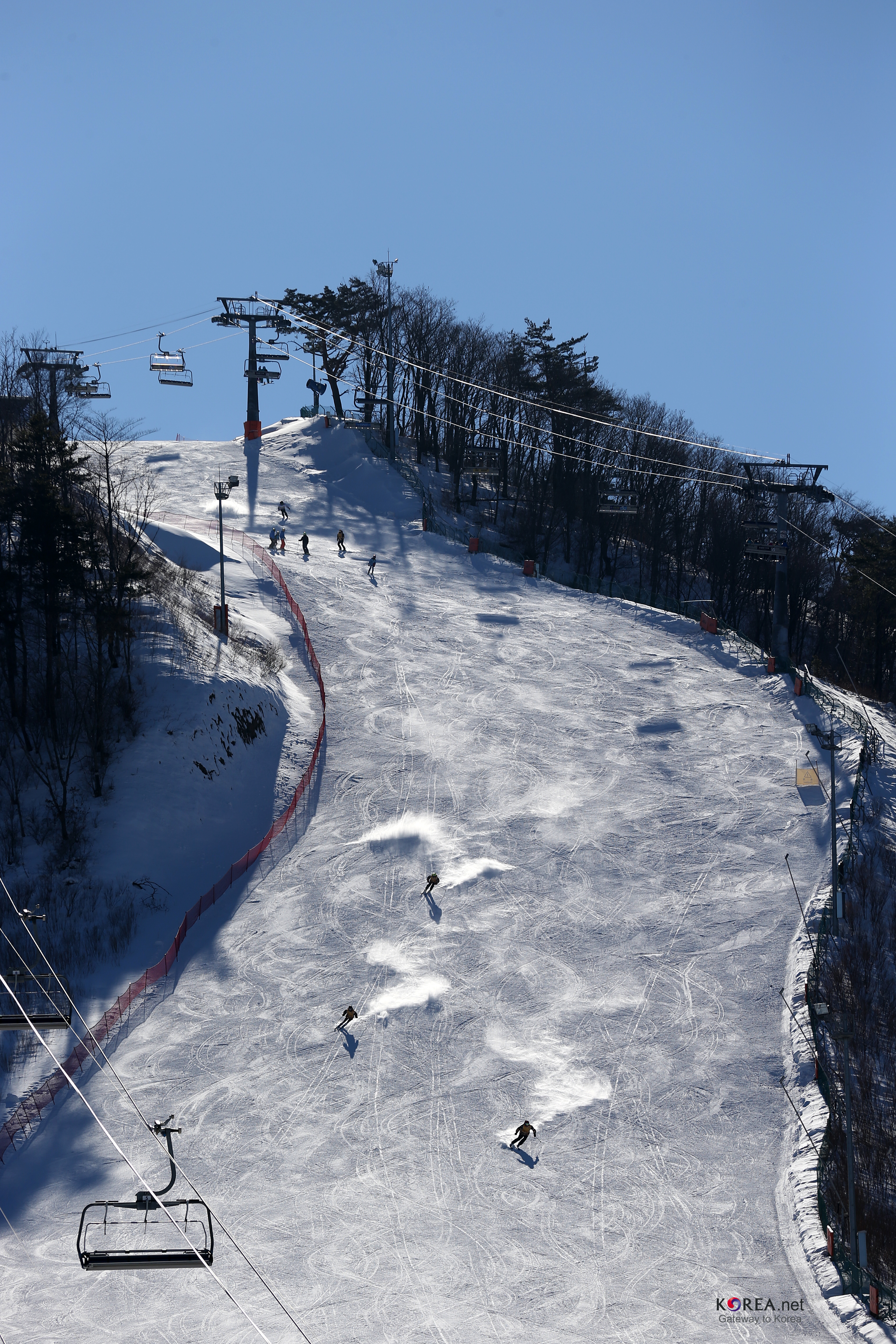
One of the venues that was used for the 2018 Winter Olympics (taken in 2013).

On 6 July 2011, Pyeongchang was announced as the host of the 2018 Winter Olympics and the 2018 Winter Paralympics. The other candidates were Annecy, France and Munich, Germany. It is the third Winter Games in Asia after the 1972 games in Sapporo, Japan and the 1998 games in Nagano, Japan. It also is the first Asian locality to host the Winter Games outside Japan. Pyeongchang won their 2018 bid after two previous failed attempts for the 2010 and 2014 Winter Olympics, to which it lost to Vancouver, Canada, and Sochi, Russia, respectively.

For the 2018 Olympics, Pyeongchang was marketed with the CamelCase spelling of "PyeongChang", so the global audience would not confuse it with Pyongyang, the capital of neighboring North Korea. The two main facilities created for the 2018 Winter Olympics were the PyeongChang Olympic Plaza (where the opening / closing ceremonies and victory ceremonies were held) and the Gangneung Olympic Park (where the men's and women's short track, speed skating, figure skating, ice hockey, curling events were held). The 2018 Winter Paralympics was held in the same venues starting 9 March 2018.

==== Olympic venues and Dream Program ====
In preparation for the 2018 Olympics, the region built facilities including hotels and a world-class ski resort, named Alpensia.

The region also ran the "2018 Dream Program", a program initially created in relation to the 2010 bid. The 2018 Dream Program was the fifth iteration of this sports and cultural program, involving 124 participants from 31 countries, who were invited because they live where there is no snowfall and have no opportunity to participate in winter sports.

=== 2024 Winter Youth Olympics ===
Gangwon Province, which includes Pyeongchang, was chosen as the host for the 2024 Winter Youth Olympics. Outdoor venues in Pyeongchang used in the 2018 Winter Olympics have been repurposed for the games.

== Transportation ==
Pyeongchang County is traversed from west to east by the Gyeonggang Line and Yeongdong Expressway. The railway and expressway both originate in the Seoul metropolitan region.

=== Trains ===
A new KTX line, named the Gyeonggang Line, was built between Wonju and Gangneung via Pyeongchang for the 2018 Winter Olympics, connecting Pyeongchang to Seoul with a journey time of less than 80 minutes. The new line, which was officially opened on 22 August 2017, provides a main-line high-speed rail service that passes through Pyeongchang from west to east, with KTX trains calling at Pyeongchang station and Jinbu station (for the Olympic Stadium). KTX trains to Jinbu station were increased for the duration of the 2018 Olympics.

=== Buses ===
Intercity Buses

Pyeongchang Bus Terminal and Jangpyeong Bus Terminal, Jinbu Bus Station and Hoenggye Bus Station are the main intercity bus terminals of the county. Daehwa Bus Station is also served by intercity buses.

Transit buses

Local transit operators connect communities in the county to hubs at Pyeongchang Bus Station, Jangpyeong Bus Terminal, and Jinbu Bus Station.

=== Road ===
Expressways

Yeongdong Expressway passes through Pyeongchang from west to east. After the expressway was expanded in 1999 for the Winter Asian Games, it takes about two hours from Seoul to Pyeongchang by car.

Expressways
Yeongdong Expressway	E.Dunnae IC ↔ Myeonon IC ↔ Pyeongchang IC ↔ Soksa IC ↔ Jinbu IC ↔ Daegwallyeong IC↔ Gangneung JC

National highways

Pyeongchang County is traversed from west to east by National Routes 6 and 42; National Routes 31 and 59 pass through from north to south.

== Administrative divisions ==
The district includes one town (eup), Pyeongchang-eup (평창읍; 平昌邑) and seven townships (myeon):

Pyeongchang-eup (평창읍; 平昌邑): County seat; Bangnim-myeon (방림면; 芳林面); Bongpyeong-myeon (봉평면; 蓬坪面); Daegwallyeong-myeon (대관령면; 大關嶺面): The center of winter sports that hosted the 2018 Winter Olympics; Daehwa-myeon (대화면; 大和面); Jinbu-myeon (진부면; 珍富面); Mitan-myeon (미탄면; 美灘面); Yongpyeong-myeon (용평면; 龍坪面)
