= Bell of Yongjusa =

9th-century bell from Korea

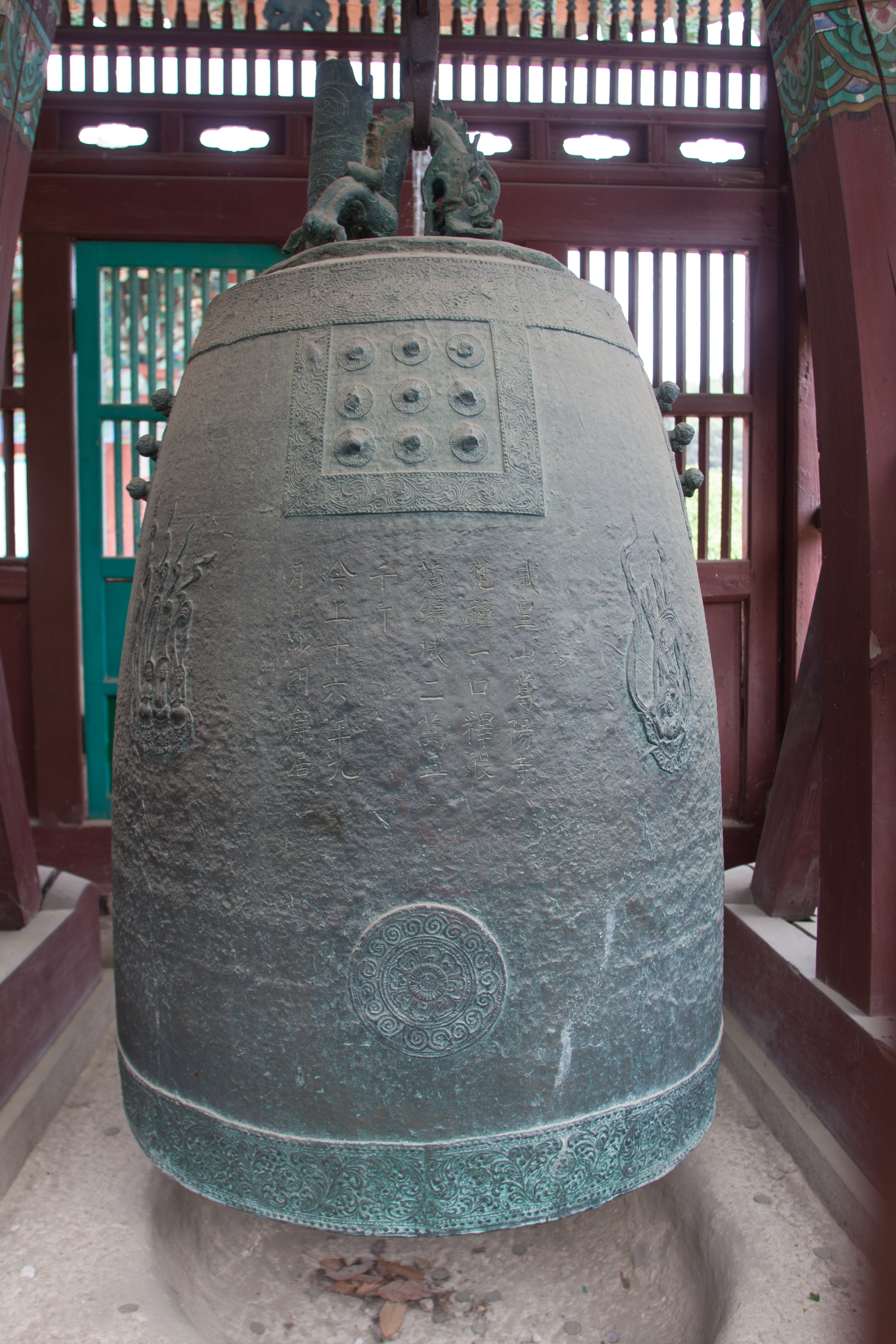

Korean name
- Hangul: 용주사 동종
- Hanja: 龍珠寺 銅鐘
- RR: Yongjusa dongjong
- MR: Yongjusa tongjong

The Bell of Yongjusa (Korean: 용주사 동종) is located in the temple of Yongjusa, near Suwon, Gyeonggi Province, South Korea.

== History ==
The bronze bell was cast and installed in the temple in 854. The temple was destroyed in 1636 during the Second Manchu invasion of Korea but the bell survived. The temple was rebuilt in 1790 and the bell reinstalled.

The bell is listed at number 120 in the "National Treasures of South Korea" list.

== See also ==
- Culture of Korea
- Korean Art
- Bell of King Seongdeok
- Bell of Cheonheungsa
- Bell of Sangwonsa
