= Jinbu-myeon =

- Township
- Location of Yongpyeong-myeon in South Korea
- Coordinates: 37°38′11.78″N 128°33′29.08″E
- Country: South Korea
- Province: Gangwon
- County: Pyeongchang
- Administrative divisions: 14 ri

Area
  - Total: 331.14 km^{2} (127.85 sq mi)

Population (2008)
  - Total: 10,203
- Time zone: UTC+9 (Korea Standard Time)

Korean name
- Hangul: 진부면
- Hanja: 珍富面
- RR: Jinbu-myeon
- MR: Chinbu-myŏn

Jinbu-myeon (Korean: 진부면) is a myeon (township) in Pyeongchang county of Gangwon Province South Korea. The myeon is located in northern central part of the county. The total area of Bongpyeong-myeon is 331.14 square kilometers, and, as of 2008, the population was 10,203 people.

== Places of interest ==
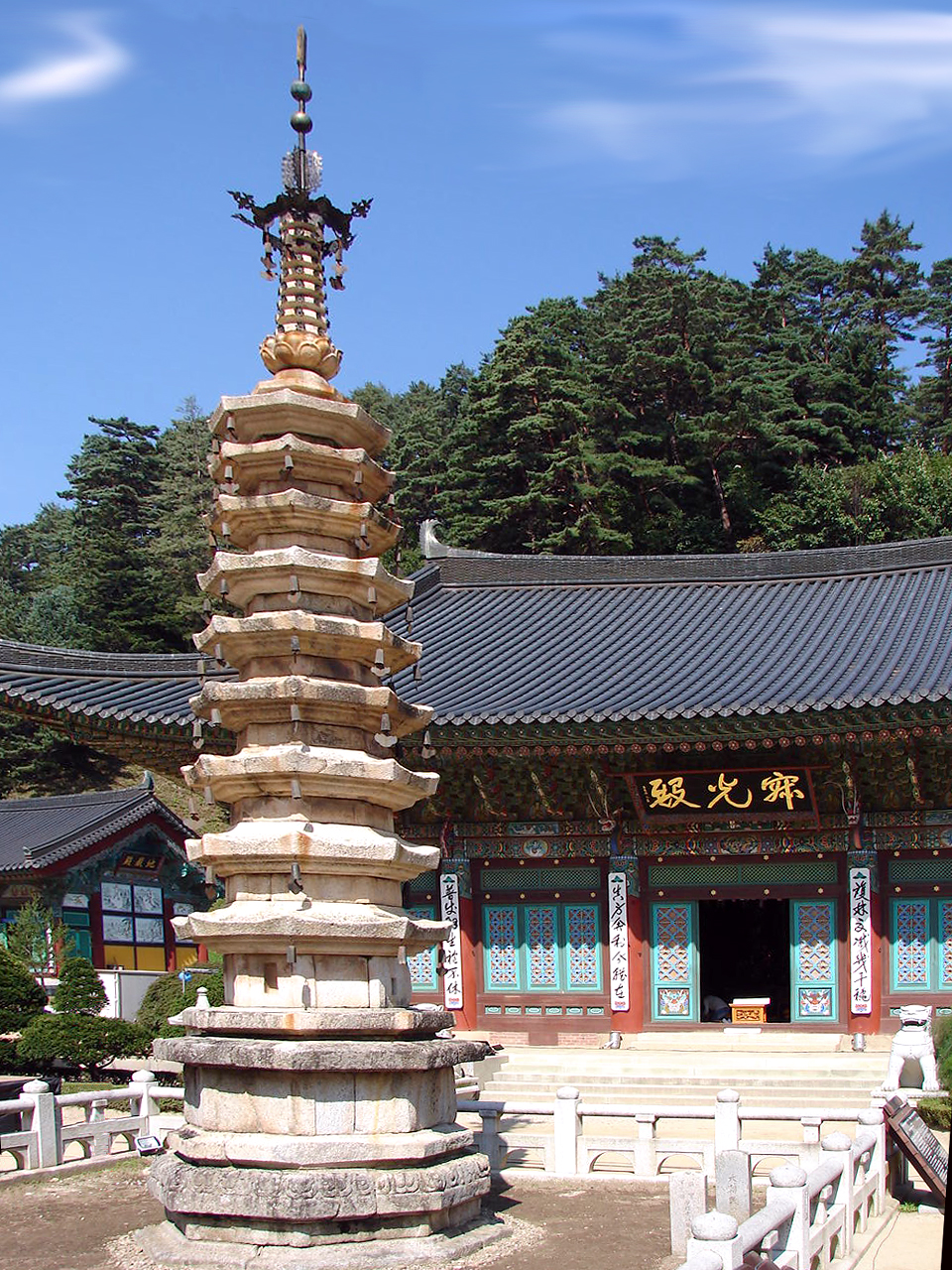
Woljeongsa octagonal nine-story pagoda

- Woljeongsa
- Sangwonsa
- Gariwangsan
- Odaesan
