= Bell of King Seongdeok =

Largest extant bronze bell in Korea

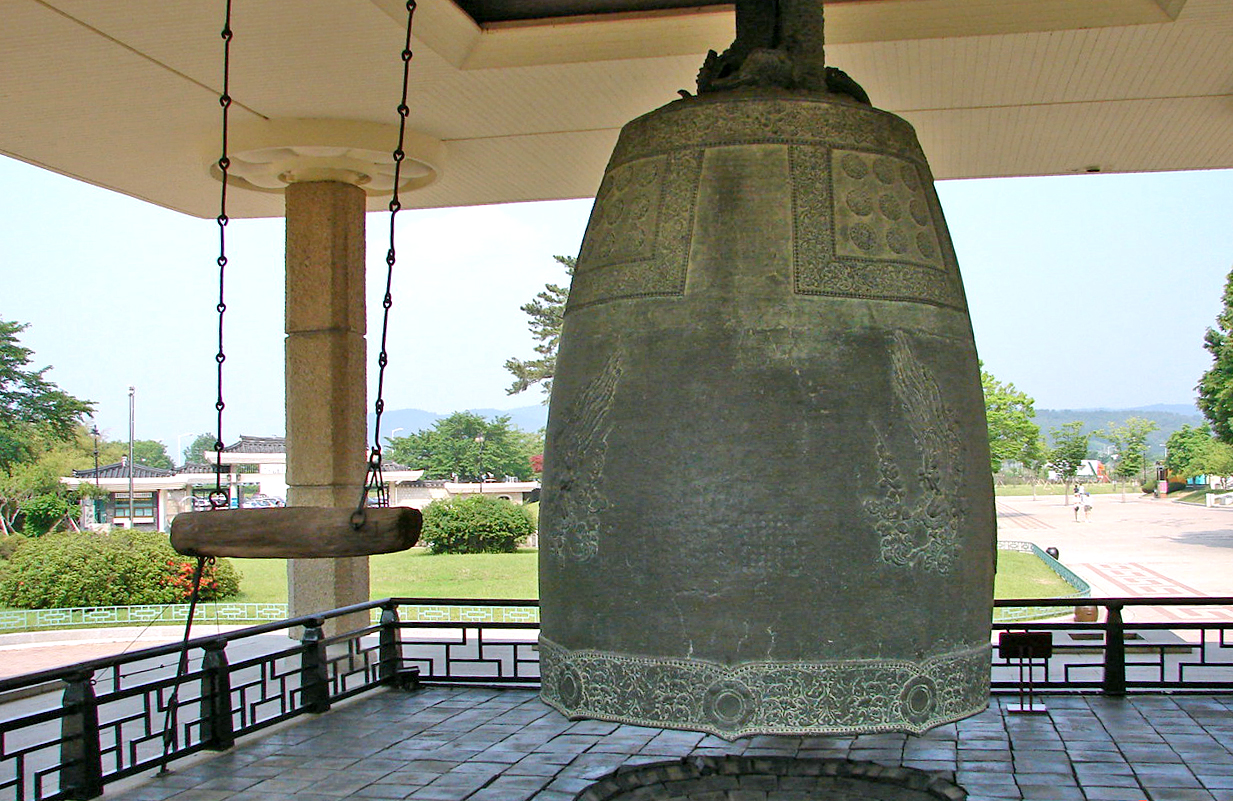
- The bell (2006)
- Designation

National Treasure (South Korea)
- Official name: Sacred Bell of Great King Seongdeok
- Designated: 1962-12-20
- Reference no.: 29
- Location: 35°49′46.47″N 129°13′40.54″E

Korean name
- Hangul: 성덕대왕신종
- Hanja: 聖德大王神鍾
- RR: Seongdeok daewang sinjong
- MR: Sŏngdŏk taewang sinjong

Alternate name
- Hangul: 에밀레종
- Hanja: 에밀레鍾
- RR: Emillejong
- MR: Emillejong

The Sacred Bell of Great King Seongdeok (Korean: 성덕대왕신종; Hanja: 聖德大王神鍾) is the largest extant bronze bell in Korea. It is also known as the Emille Bell (에밀레종), after a legend about its casting, and as the Bell of Bongdeoksa, where it was first housed. The bell was also previously housed at Gyeongjueupseong.

The bell was commissioned by King Gyeongdeok to honor his father, King Seongdeok. However, King Gyeongdeok never lived to see the casting of the bell, as he died in AD 765. The bell was finally cast in AD 771, during the reign of Gyeongdeok's son, King Hyegong.

Now housed in the Gyeongju National Museum, the bell was designated as the 29th national treasure of Korea on December 12, 1962. It measures 3.75 meters (12.3 ft) high, 2.27 meters (7.4 ft) in diameter at the lip, and 12 to 25 centimeters (4.7 to 9.8 in) in wall thickness. The Gyeongju National Museum weighed it in 1997, and found that its weight was 18.9 tons.

== Artistic characteristics ==
The bell is considered a masterpiece of Unified Silla art. It is unique among Korean bronze bells because of the presence of delicate designs and the title text, written in an elegant literary language. The whole structure, including its decorative elements, produces a wide range of sound frequencies; the sound tube absorbs high frequency waves, contributing to a distinctive beat.

The hook of the bell is in the shape of a dragon's head. There are many relief patterns on the bell, including flower patterns along the rim and shoulder. There are also reliefs of lotus flowers, grass, and a pair of two apsaras (heavenly maidens). The striking point of the bell (dangjwa) is also in the shape of a lotus and sits between two of the apsara reliefs. The bottom of the bell is in a rhombic shape, designed to augment the sound reverberation.

The inscriptions on the bell (the title text), over a thousand Hanja, are a fine example of Korean calligraphy and carving. They provide detailed information about the bell and why it was cast.

The column the bell hangs on is quite firm. Even a column of the same diameter, made of a modern alloy, might bend under the weight of the bell, yet the bell still hangs on an ancient column that has lasted for several centuries.

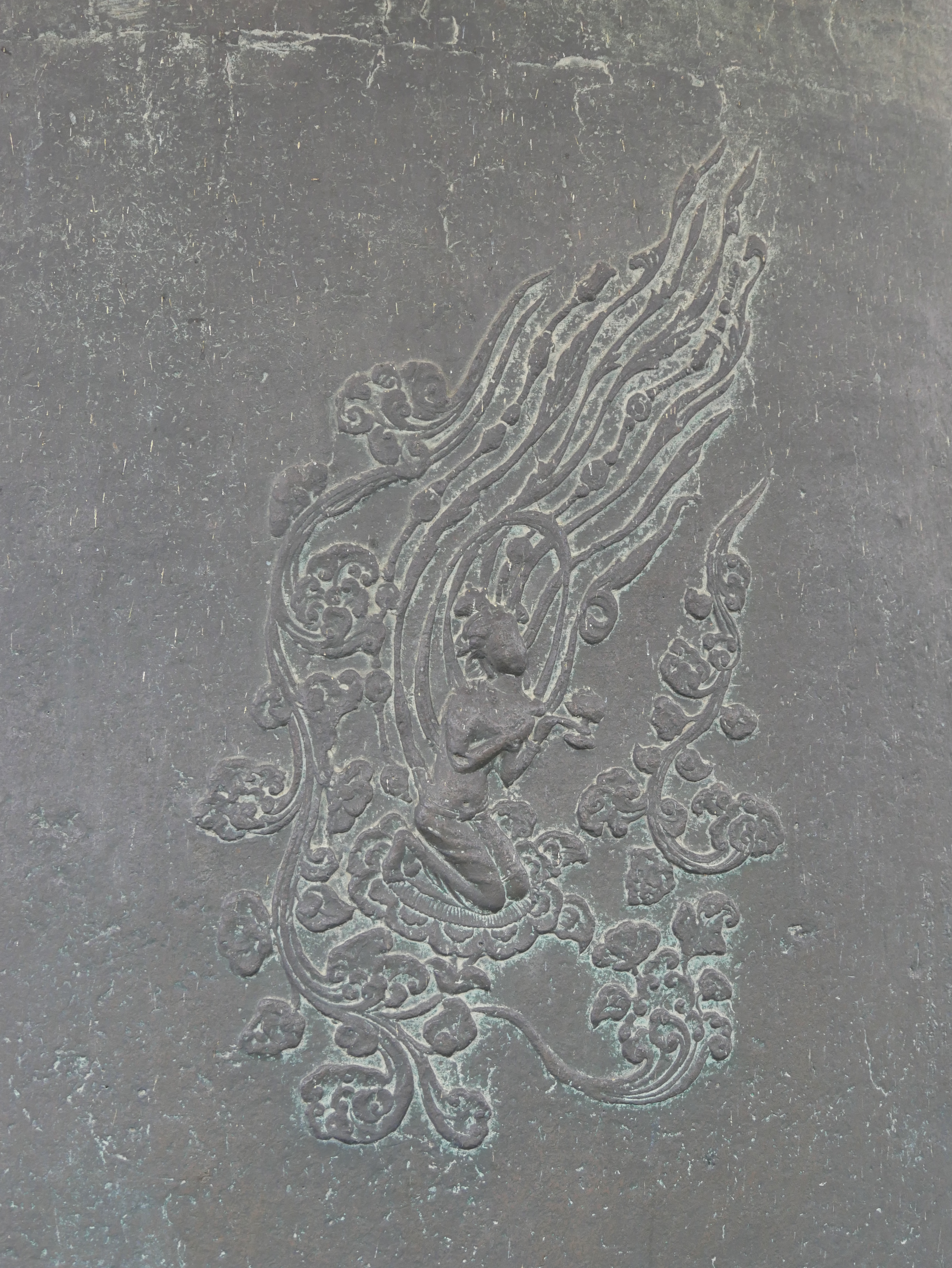
Apsara relief

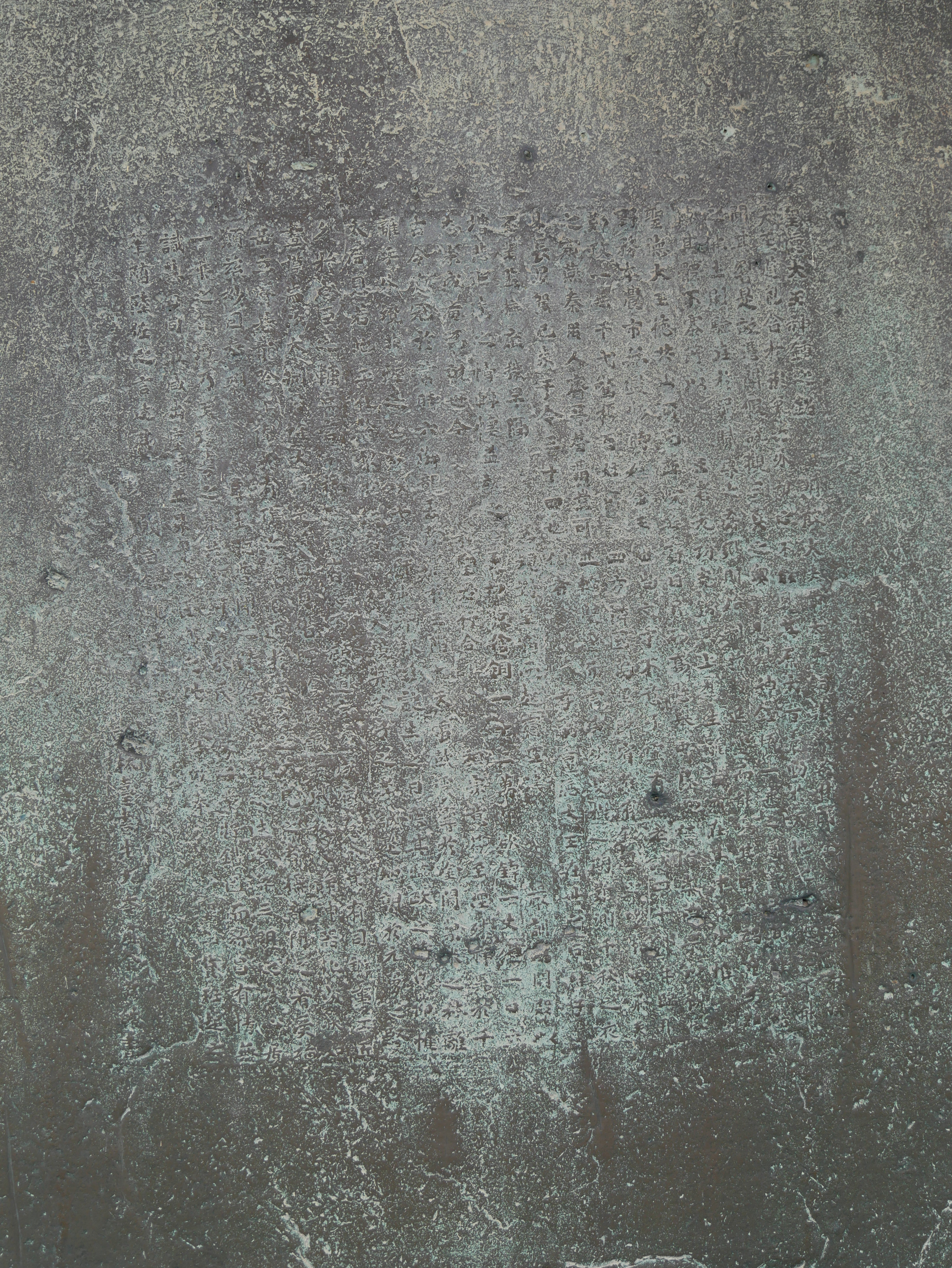
Carved Korean calligraphy

== Legend ==
The monks of Bongdeoksa went around to receive donations to make a bell to honor King Seongdeok. When the chief monk visited a house and asked for a donation, a woman came out and said that she was so poor that she had nothing but her child to give. The monk returned to the temple and had a dream that night which told him he needed the child to complete the bell. The next day, the monk asked the woman to give him the child and put the child in the molten iron. When the completed bell was rung, it sounded like "emille", the sound of a child desperately calling for his/her mother. This is how the bell came to be called Emille Bell. The story emphasizes the need for great human sacrifice to create a sacred bell. It is also seen as an expression of the resentment of the people caused by the large-scale bell-making project.

Whether the legend is true is disputed. The legend is not recorded in official history books. One of the oldest records about the legend is believed to be Homer Hulbert's 1906 book The Passing of Korea, which states that the bell is in Seoul instead of Gyeongju. Also, according to 1998 composition analysis by the Research Institute of Industrial Science & Technology, phosphorus, the main component of bones, was not detected, debunking the legend. On the other hand, child's bones were found in a well made in Unified Silla, suggesting that human sacrifice may have existed in Silla.

== In modern media ==
The sound of the bell was featured on "No. 29", the sixth track on BTS's album Arirang.

== See also ==
- Korean Bell of Friendship: Bell in the United States modeled after the Bell of King Seongdeok
- Bell of Yongjusa
