= Seven-story Pagoda =

Seven-story Pagoda may refer to:

- Seven-story Stone Pagoda in Tappyeong-ri, Chungju
- Seven-story Brick Pagoda at Beopheungsa Temple Site, Andong
- Seven-Story Pagoda at Shōkoku-ji

== See also ==
- Seven Storey Mountain
- Seven Story Drop
