= Ilseongnok =

Joseon court records from 1760 to 1910

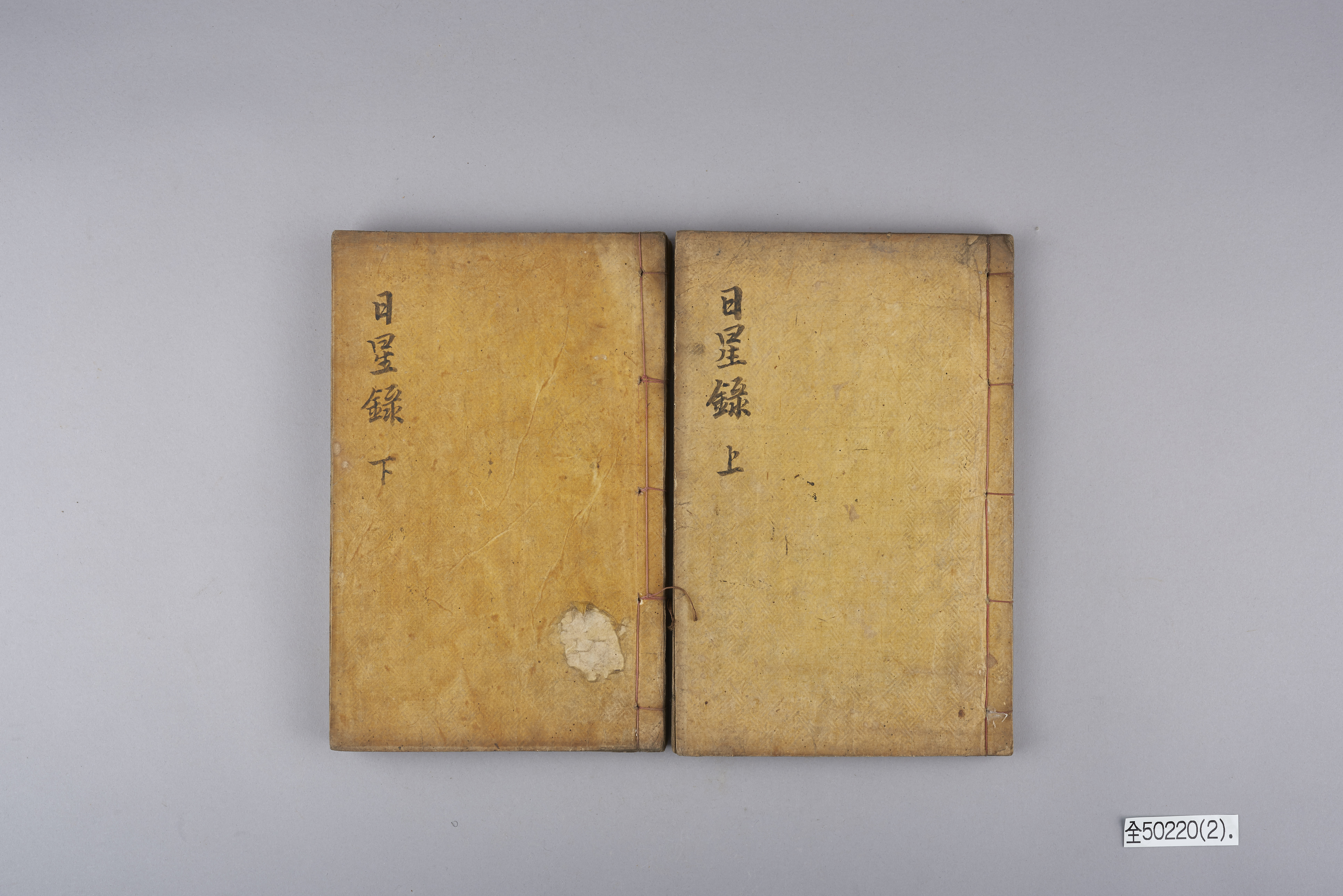
- Author: Joseon Dynasty
- Language: Middle Korean, Early Modern Korean
- Publication place: Joseon
- Website: https://kyudb.snu.ac.kr/series/main.do?item_cd=ILS

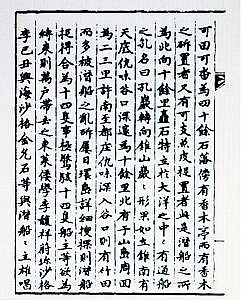
A page from the Ilseongnok, dating to 1807

Ilseongnok (Korean: 일성록; Hanja: 日省錄), known as The Records of Daily Reflections or Diary of Self-examination in English, is a daily record of court events. The extant records cover the last 150 years of the Joseon dynasty, from 1760 to 1910.

On December 31, 1973, it was designated as the 153rd national treasure of Korea. In May 2011, it was listed in UNESCO's Memory of the World registry. The Ilseongnok is a vital historical record, and along with the Joseon Wangjo Sillok, the Seungjeongwon ilgi, and the Bibyeonsa Teungrok, constitutes one of the primary historical sources for the study of the period.

== Description ==
Ilseongnok began as the personal diary of King Jeongjo, and was collected even before he ascended the throne in 1776. He wrote personal reflections and thoughts in the diary. In 1781, he expressed interest in having his diary be made available to and continued by his successors. He reportedly considered calling the text either Ilseongnok, Wolgyerok (월계록; 月計錄), or Ilwoltongpyeon (일월통편; 日月通編; combined meaning of the two previous names), but decided against the latter name because it was already used by another text. In 1785 or 1786, he converted it into an official daily journal of state affairs. The journal was maintained with the help of officials from Kyujanggak, the royal library.

== See also ==
- Annals of the Joseon Dynasty
- Seungjeongwon ilgi
- Uigwe
- History of Korea
- Joseon Dynasty politics
