= Bukhansan Monument =

6th-century Silla stone monument

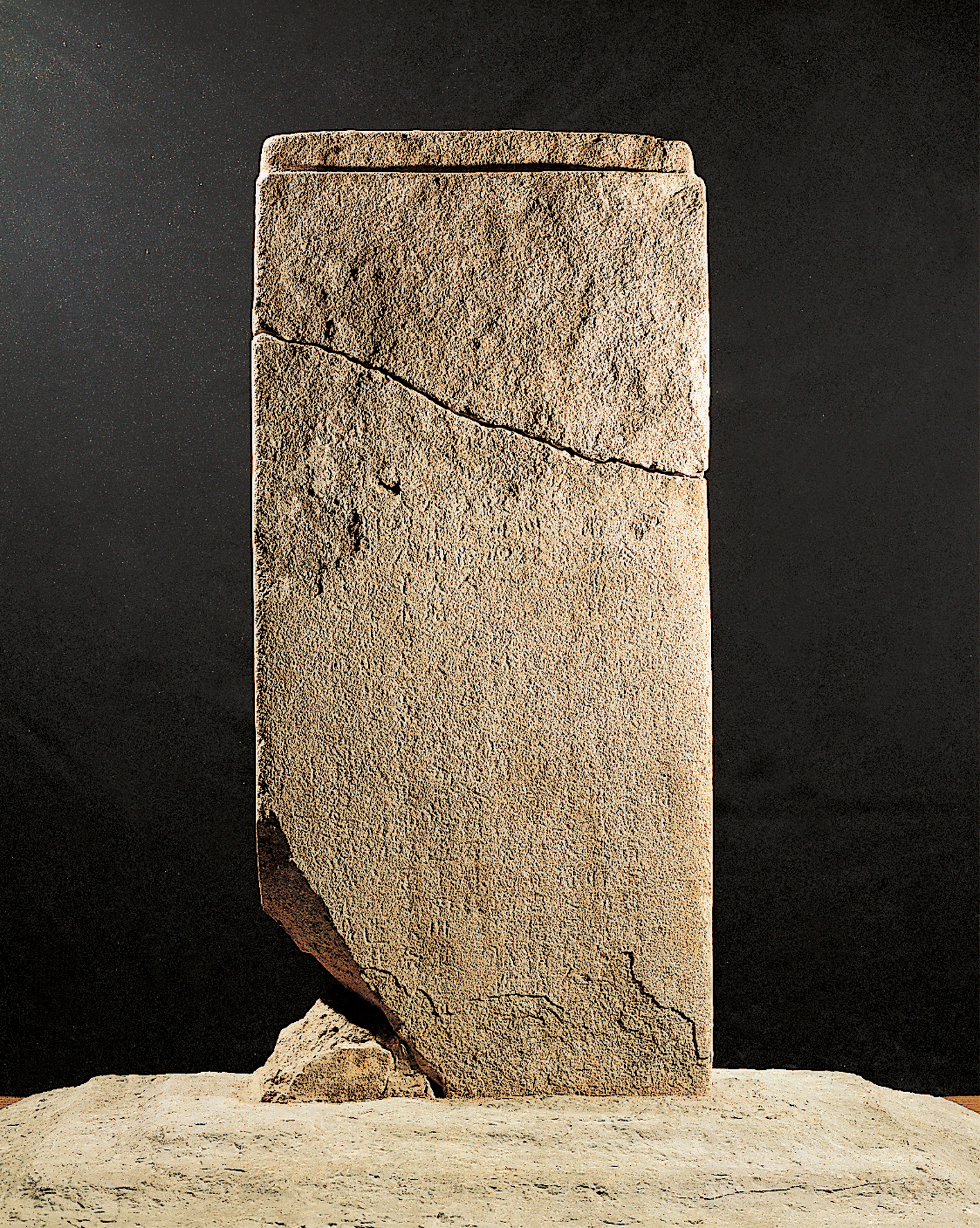
- The monument in the National Museum of Korea
- Location: National Museum of Korea (current); Bukhansan (original)
- Coordinates: 37.5242°N 126.9803°E
- Completion date: 6th century CE

National Treasure (South Korea)
- Designated: 1962-12-20
- Reference no.: 3

Historic Sites of South Korea
- Official name: Site of the Monument on Bukhansan Mountain Commemorating the Border Inspection by King Jinheung
- Designated: 1972-07-24

Korean name
- Hangul: 북한산 신라 진흥왕 순수비
- Hanja: 北漢山新羅眞興王巡狩碑
- RR: Bukhansan Silla Jinheungwang sunsubi
- MR: Pukhansan Silla Chinhŭngwang sunsubi

Bukhansan Monument (Korean: 북한산 신라 진흥왕 순수비; Hanja: 北漢山新羅眞興王巡狩碑) is a stone monument dated roughly to the 6th century CE. It was designated as the 3rd National Treasure of Korea on December 20, 1962.

The stone monument was originally erected on the peak Bibong (비봉; 碑峰) of the mountain Bukhansan. The exact date of its creation is unclear, as the era name is illegible. However, it is believed to be from around 561 CE or 568 CE because the Changnyeongbi Monument and the Hwangchoryeongbi Monument were built on those dates respectively. It was rediscovered in 1816 during the reign of Emperor Sunjo by Kim Chŏnghŭi, a famous calligrapher. It was subsequently moved to Gyeongbokgung Palace for safekeeping and is now displayed in the National Museum of Korea.

The rectangular monument is built on a two-story pedestal. Because the monument was exposed to the elements for 1400 years it has suffered weathering and erosion damage. It is currently 154 centimeters high and 69 centimeters wide.

The monument is valuable for the historical information inscribed on its surface. It is written in a cursive regular script. There are 12 lines with 32 characters per line. The inscription praises the Silla King Jinheung's (r. 540–575) territorial expansion into the Han River valley and commemorates the occasion when the king came and inspected the new borders of his realm. The inscription explains why the monument was built, describes the achievements of King Jinheung, and also describes the royal retinue.

== See also ==
- National treasures of Korea
- Stele
