= Jinnamgwan Hall =

Historic building in Yeosu, South Korea

- 진남관
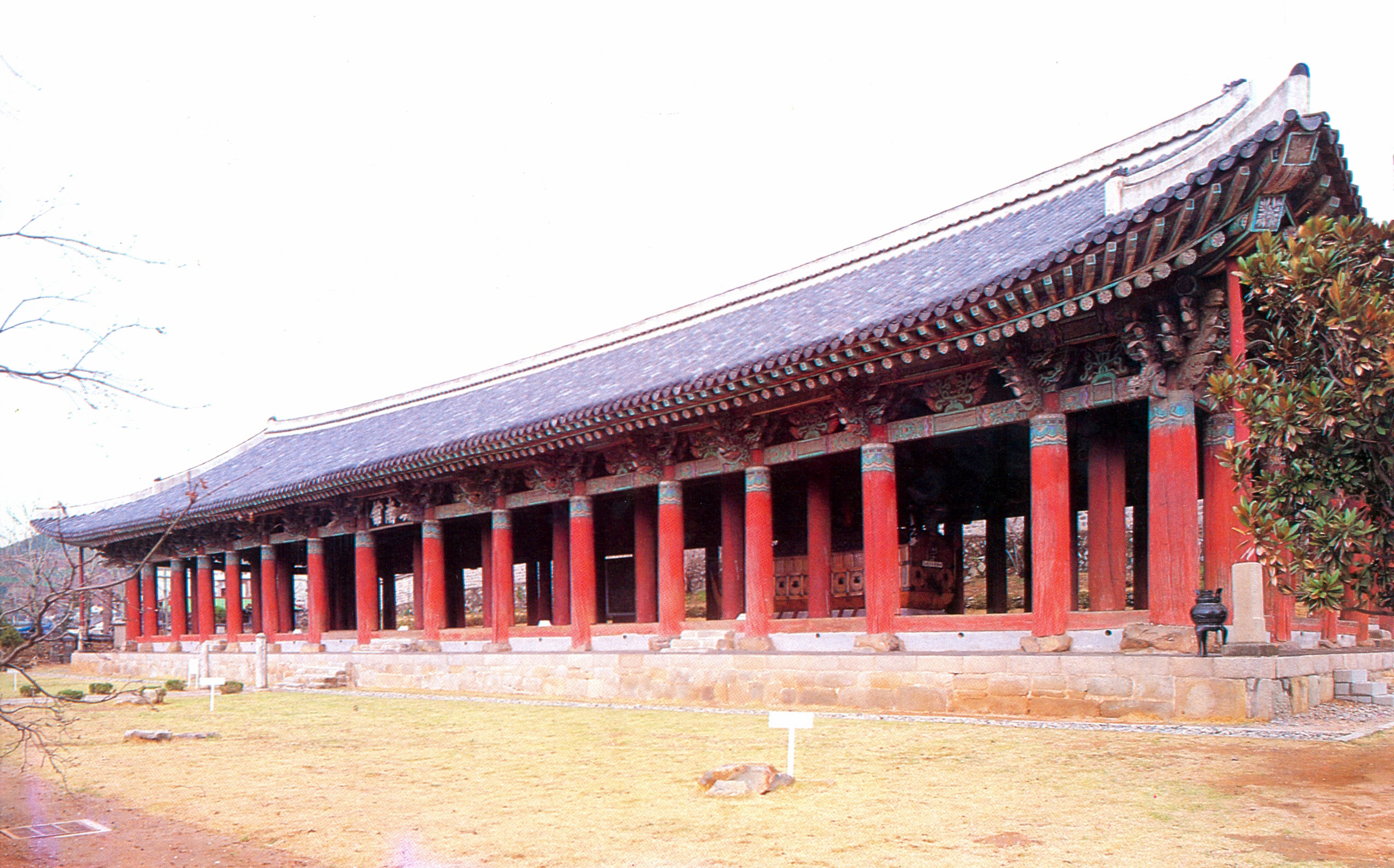
- The Jinnamgwan Hall

- Location within South Korea

General information
- Location: Yeosu, South Jeolla Province, South Korea, South Korea
- Coordinates: 34°44′31″N 127°44′12″E
- Completed: 1599

Height
- Height: 14 m (46 ft)

Dimensions
- Other dimensions: 75 m (246 ft) long

Technical details
- Material: Wood
- Floor count: 1
- Floor area: 800 m^{2} (8,600 sq ft)

Jinnamgwan Hall (Korean: 진남관) is a historical building in the South Korean city Yeosu. The wooden structure consists of a roof, that is supported by 68 columns. It is decorated with carved lotus buds, dragon heads, and Dancheong paintwork. Jinnamgwan Hall is 75 m (246 ft) long and 14 m (46 ft) tall.

The original building, commissioned by Naval Commander Yi Si-eon, was completed in 1599 during the Joseon dynasty. It stood on the former site of Jinhaeru, the naval base of Jeolla Province. That naval base was the headquarters of Admiral Yi Sun-sin during the Japanese invasion of Korea in 1592 and burned down in 1597. Jinnamgwan Hall was used as a guest house (gaeksa) for government officials.

A fire destroyed the building in 1716, but it was rebuilt two years later by Admiral Yi Je-myeon. Jinnamgwan Hall was converted into an elementary school in 1911 during the Japanese rule over Korea, damaging the original structure. It was designated as a National Treasure (no. 304) on April 17, 2001. Jinnamgwan Hall underwent a restoration starting in 2015.
