= Stele of Bongseon Honggyeongsa =

Goreo-era monument in Cheonan, South Korea

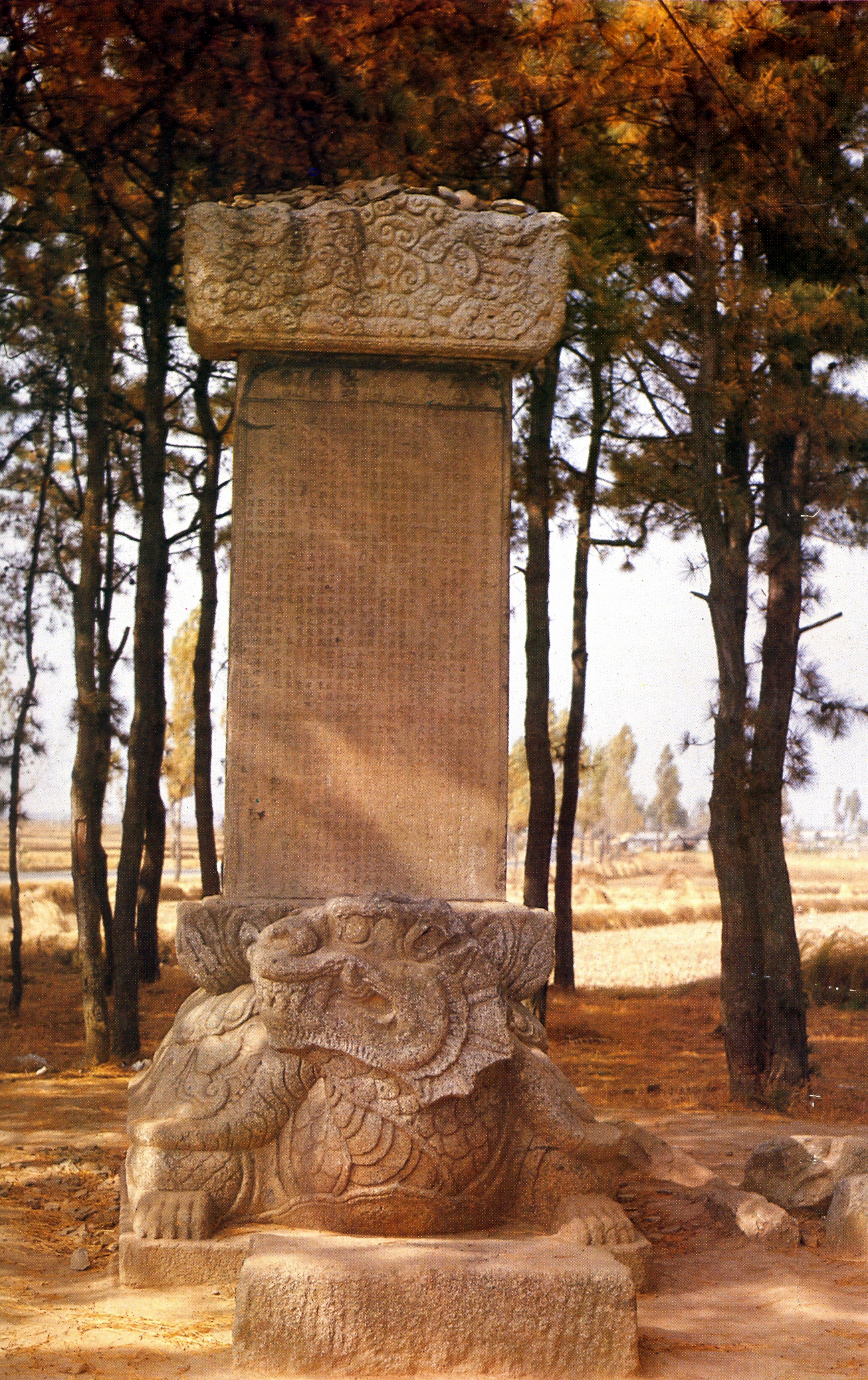
- The stele (2009)
- Interactive map of Stele of Bongseon Honggyeongsa
- Coordinates: 36°56′N 127°08′E

National Treasure (South Korea)
- Designated: 1962-12-20
- Reference no.: 7

Korean name
- Hangul: 봉선홍경사 적갈비
- Hanja: 奉先弘慶寺蹟碣碑
- Revised Romanization: Bongseonhonggyeongsa Jeokgalbi
- McCune–Reischauer: Pongsŏnhonggyŏngsa Chŏkkalbi

The Stele of Bongseon Honggyeongsa Temple (Korean: 봉선홍경사 적갈비; Hanja: 奉先弘慶寺蹟碣碑) is a Goryeo-era stone stele currently located in Seonghwan-eup, Cheonan in South Chungcheong Province, South Korea. It was designated as National Treasure of Korea No. 7 on December 20, 1962.

The temple Bongseon Honggyeongsa was built in 1021, during the reign of King Hyeonjong. He built the temple in accordance with the wishes of his father, King Anjong, and because he was inspired by the Lotus Sutra. "Bongseon", which means "In Reverence of Father's Wishes", was added to the name of the temple. The stele commemorates the construction of the temple which was set up in 1026 CE, five years after the temple was constructed. The stele is all that remains of the temple.

The inscription of the stele was composed by Choi Chung, also known as Haedonggongja, one of the greatest Confucian scholars and writers during the Goryeo Dynasty, and the calligraphy, in semi-cursive style, was done by Baek Hyeonrye. The inscription describes the foundation of the temple.

The stone stele rests on a pedestal shaped like a tortoise. The dragon-heads of the pedestal are facing the side instead of the front, a style that has often been used in East Asian stele. The head is also carved with fin-like wings that give the head the impression of dynamism and motion. The body of the stele is capped with a stone that is rounded and shows a dragon in the clouds.
