= National Treasure (South Korea) =

- Hangul: 국보
- Hanja: 國寶
- RR: Gukbo
- MR: Kukpo

National Treasure (Korean: 국보) is a national-level designation within the heritage preservation system of South Korea for tangible objects of significant artistic, cultural, and historical value. Examples of objects include art, artifacts, sites, or buildings. It is administered by the Korea Heritage Service (KHS). Additions to the list are decided by the Cultural Heritage Committee.

Many of the registered items are popular tourist attractions for South Korea. Examples include Jongmyo, Bulguksa, Seokguram, and the Tripitaka Koreana at Haeinsa. As of May 2026, there are 368 distinct entries on the list, some composed of a large number of sub-entries.

== History ==
The first list of Korean cultural treasures was designated by Governor-General of Korea in 1938 during the Japanese occupation under the "Chōsen Treasures Act" (朝鮮宝物令).

In 1955, the South Korean government declared as National Treasures the items previously on the Korean Treasures Preservation Order issued during Japan's occupation of Korea. The current list dates to December 20, 1962, when the Cultural Protection Act was enacted by the Supreme Council for National Reconstruction. There were 116 items on the "National Treasures" list at that time, with others designated as "Treasures".

On November 19, 2021, the Cultural Heritage Administration (now Korea Heritage Service) removed the numbering system for all of its designations, including National Treasures. The numbering system was removed due to a misconception that the numbers denote a national treasure's significance or value, when the numbers were assigned according to the treasures' order of designation.

== List ==
No. (Note: Numbering system was removed on November 19, 2021; previous numbers are preserved for reference's sake.)	Image	Official names (Note: English, Hangul, Hanja/mixed script)	Location	Dates	Refs
1		Sungnyemun Gate, Seoul 서울 숭례문 서울 崇禮門	Jung District, Seoul	1962-12-20	
2		Ten-story Stone Pagoda at Wongaksa Temple Site, Seoul 서울 원각사지 십층석탑 서울 圓覺寺址 十層石塔	Jongno District, Seoul	1962-12-20; 2010-12-27 renamed	
3		Monument on Bukhansan Mountain Commemorating the Border Inspection by King Jinheung of Silla, Seoul 서울 북한산 신라 진흥왕 순수비 서울 北漢山 新羅 眞興王 巡狩碑	Yongsan District, Seoul	1962-12-20; 2010-12-27 renamed	
4		Godalsaji Stupa 여주 고달사지 승탑 驪州 高達寺址 僧塔	Yeoju, Gyeonggi	1962-12-20; 2010-12-27 renamed	
5		Twin Lion Stone Lantern of Beopjusa Temple, Boeun 보은 법주사 쌍사자 석등 報恩 法住寺 雙獅子 石燈	Boeun County, North Chungcheong	1962-12-20; 2010-12-27 renamed	
6		Seven-story Stone Pagoda in Tappyeong-ri, Chungju 충주 탑평리 칠층석탑 忠州 塔坪里 七層石塔	Chungju, North Chungcheong	1962-12-20; 2010-12-27 renamed	
7		Stele for the Construction of Bongseonhonggyeongsa Temple, Cheonan 천안 봉선홍경사 갈기비 天安 奉先弘慶寺 碣記碑	Cheonan, South Chungcheong	1962-12-20; 2010-12-27 renamed	
8		Stele for Buddhist Monk Nanghye at Seongjusa Temple Site, Boryeong 보령 성주사지 낭혜화상탑비 保寧 聖住寺址 郎慧和尙塔碑	Boryeong, South Chungcheong	1962-12-20; 2010-12-27 renamed	
9		Five-story Stone Pagoda at Jeongnimsa Temple Site, Buyeo 부여 정림사지 오층석탑 扶餘 定林寺址 五層石塔	Buyeo County, South Chungcheong	1962-12-20; 2010-12-27 renamed	
10		Three-story Stone Pagoda at Baekjangam Hermitage of Silsangsa Temple, Namwon 남원 실상사 백장암 삼층석탑 南原 實相寺 百丈庵 三層石塔	Namwon, North Jeolla	1962-12-20; 2010-12-27 renamed	
11		Mireuksaji Stone Pagoda 익산 미륵사지 석탑 益山 彌勒寺址 石塔	Iksan, North Jeolla	1962-12-20; 2010-12-27 renamed	
12		Stone Lantern at Gakhwangjeon Hall of Hwaeomsa Temple, Gurye 구례 화엄사 각황전 앞 석등 求禮 華嚴寺 覺皇殿 앞 石燈	Gurye County, South Jeolla	1962-12-20; 2010-12-27 renamed	
13		Geungnakbojeon Hall of Muwisa Temple, Gangjin 강진 무위사 극락보전 康津 無爲寺 極樂寶殿	Gangjin County, South Jeolla	1962-12-20	
14		Yeongsanjeon Hall of Geojoam Hermitage of Eunhaesa Temple, Yeongcheon 영천 은해사 거조암 영산전 永川 銀海寺 居祖庵 靈山殿	Yeongcheon, North Gyeongsang	1962-12-20	
15		Geungnakjeon Hall of Bongjeongsa Temple, Andong 안동 봉정사 극락전 安東 鳳停寺 極樂殿	Andong, North Gyeongsang	1962-12-20	
16		Seven-story Brick Pagoda at Beopheungsa Temple Site, Andong 안동 법흥사지 칠층전탑 安東 法興寺址 七層塼塔	Andong, North Gyeongsang	1962-12-20; 2010-12-27 renamed	
17		Stone Lantern at Muryangsujeon Hall of Buseoksa Temple, Yeongju 영주 부석사 무량수전 앞 석등 榮州 浮石寺 無量壽殿 앞 石燈	Yeongju, North Gyeongsang	1962-12-20; 2010-12-27 renamed	
18		Muryangsujeon Hall of Buseoksa Temple, Yeongju 영주 부석사 무량수전 榮州 浮石寺 無量壽殿	Yeongju, North Gyeongsang	1962-12-20	
19		Josadang Shrine of Buseoksa Temple, Yeongju 영주 부석사 조사당 榮州 浮石寺 祖師堂	Yeongju, North Gyeongsang	1962-12-20	
20		Dabotap Pagoda of Bulguksa Temple, Gyeongju 경주 불국사 다보탑 慶州 佛國寺 多寶塔	Gyeongju, North Gyeongsang	1962-12-20; 2010-12-27 renamed	
21		Three-story Stone Pagoda of Bulguksa Temple, Gyeongju 경주 불국사 삼층석탑 慶州 佛國寺 三層石塔	Gyeongju, North Gyeongsang	1962-12-20; 2010-12-27 renamed	
22		Yeonhwagyo and Chilbogyo Bridges of Bulguksa Temple, Gyeongju 경주 불국사 연화교 및 칠보교 慶州 佛國寺 蓮華橋 및 七寶橋	Gyeongju, North Gyeongsang	1962-12-20; 2010-12-27 renamed	
23		Cheongungyo and Baegungyo Bridges of Bulguksa Temple, Gyeongju 경주 불국사 청운교 및 백운교 慶州 佛國寺 靑雲橋 및 白雲橋	Gyeongju, North Gyeongsang	1962-12-20; 2010-12-27 renamed	
24		Seokguram Grotto, Gyeongju 경주 석굴암 석굴 慶州 石窟庵 石窟	Gyeongju, North Gyeongsang	1962-12-20; 2010-12-27 renamed	
25		Stele for King Taejong Muyeol, Gyeongju 경주 태종무열왕릉비 慶州 太宗武烈王陵碑	Gyeongju, North Gyeongsang	1962-12-20; 2010-12-27 renamed	
26		Gilt-bronze Seated Vairocana Buddha of Bulguksa Temple, Gyeongju 경주 불국사 금동비로자나불좌상 慶州 佛國寺 金銅毘盧遮那佛坐像	Gyeongju, North Gyeongsang	1962-12-20; 2010-06-28 renamed	
27		Gilt-bronze Seated Amitabha Buddha of Bulguksa Temple, Gyeongju 경주 불국사 금동아미타여래좌상 慶州 佛國寺 金銅阿彌陀如來坐像	Gyeongju, North Gyeongsang	1962-12-20; 2010-06-28 renamed	
28		Gilt-bronze Standing Bhaisajyaguru Buddha of Baengnyulsa Temple, Gyeongju 경주 백률사 금동약사여래입상 慶州 栢栗寺 金銅藥師如來立像	Gyeongju, North Gyeongsang	1962-12-20; 2010-06-28 renamed	
29		Sacred Bell of Great King Seongdeok 성덕대왕신종 聖德大王神鍾	Gyeongju, North Gyeongsang	1962-12-20	
30		Stone Brick Pagoda of Bunhwangsa Temple, Gyeongju 경주 분황사 모전석탑 慶州 芬皇寺 模塼石塔	Gyeongju, North Gyeongsang	1962-12-20; 2010-12-27 renamed	
31		Cheomseongdae Observatory, Gyeongju 경주 첨성대 慶州 瞻星臺	Gyeongju, North Gyeongsang	1962-12-20; 2010-12-27 renamed	
32		Printing Woodblocks of the Tripitaka Koreana in Haeinsa Temple, Hapcheon 합천 해인사 대장경판 陜川 海印寺 大藏經板	Hapcheon County, South Gyeongsang	1962-12-20; 2010-08-25 renamed	
33		Monument in Changnyeong Commemorating the Border Expansion by King Jinheung of Silla 창녕 신라 진흥왕 척경비 昌寧 新羅 眞興王 拓境碑	Changnyeong County, South Gyeongsang	1962-12-20; 2010-12-27 renamed	
34		East Three-story Stone Pagoda in Suljeong-ri, Changnyeong 창녕 술정리 동 삼층석탑 昌寧 述亭里 東 三層石塔	Changnyeong County, South Gyeongsang	1962-12-20; 2010-12-27 renamed	
35		Four Lion Three-story Stone Pagoda of Hwaeomsa Temple, Gurye 구례 화엄사 사사자 삼층석탑 求禮 華嚴寺 四獅子 三層石塔	Gurye County, South Jeolla	1962-12-20; 2010-12-27 renamed	
36		Bronze Bell of Sangwonsa Temple 상원사 동종 上院寺 銅鍾	Pyeongchang County, Gangwon	1962-12-20	
37		Three-story Stone Pagoda at Hwangboksa Temple Site, Gyeongju 경주 황복사지 삼층석탑 慶州 皇福寺址 三層石塔	Gyeongju, North Gyeongsang	1962-12-20; 2010-12-27 renamed	
38		Three-story Stone Pagoda from Goseonsa Temple Site, Gyeongju 경주 고선사지 삼층석탑 慶州 高仙寺址 三層石塔	Gyeongju, North Gyeongsang	1962-12-20; 2010-12-27 renamed	
39		Five-story Stone Pagoda in Nawon-ri, Gyeongju 경주 나원리 오층석탑 慶州 羅原里 五層石塔	Gyeongju, North Gyeongsang	1962-12-20; 2010-12-27 renamed	
40		Thirteen-story Stone Pagoda at Jeonghyesa Temple Site, Gyeongju 경주 정혜사지 십삼층석탑 慶州 淨惠寺址 十三層石塔	Gyeongju, North Gyeongsang	1962-12-20; 2010-12-27 renamed	
41		Iron Flagpole at Yongdusa Temple Site, Cheongju 청주 용두사지 철당간 淸州 龍頭寺址 鐵幢竿	Cheongju, North Chungcheong	1962-12-20; 2010-12-27 renamed	
42		Portable Shrine of Wooden Buddha Triad at Songgwangsa Temple, Suncheon 순천 송광사 목조삼존불감 順天 松廣寺 木彫三尊佛龕	Suncheon, South Jeolla	1962-12-20; 2010-06-28 renamed	
43		Royal Edict Issued to Great Master Hyesim 혜심고신제서 惠諶告身制書	Suncheon, South Jeolla	1962-12-20	
44		South and North Three-story Stone Pagodas and Stone Lantern of Borimsa Temple, Jangheung 장흥 보림사 남·북 삼층석탑 및 석등 長興 寶林寺 南·北 三層石塔 및 石燈	Jangheung County, South Jeolla	1962-12-20; 2010-12-27 renamed	
45		Clay Seated Buddha of Buseoksa Temple, Yeongju 영주 부석사 소조여래좌상 榮州 浮石寺 塑造如來坐像	Yeongju, North Gyeongsang	1962-12-20; 2010-06-28 renamed	
46		Mural Painting in Josadang Shrine of Buseoksa Temple 부석사조사당벽화 浮石寺祖師堂壁畵	Yeongju, North Gyeongsang	1962-12-20	
47		Stele for Master Jingam at Ssanggyesa Temple, Hadong 하동 쌍계사 진감선사탑비 河東 雙磎寺 眞鑑禪師塔碑	Hadong County, South Gyeongsang	1962-12-20; 2010-12-27 renamed	
48-1		Octagonal Nine-story Stone Pagoda of Woljeongsa Temple, Pyeongchang 평창 월정사 팔각 구층석탑 平昌 月精寺 八角 九層石塔	Pyeongchang County, Gangwon	1962-12-20; 2010-12-27 renamed 2017-01-19번호 변경	
48-2		Stone Seated Bodhisattva of Woljeongsa Temple, Pyeongchang 평창 월정사 석조보살좌상 平昌 月精寺 石造菩薩坐像	Pyeongchang County, Gangwon	2017-01-02	
49		Daeungjeon Hall of Sudeoksa Temple, Yesan 예산 수덕사 대웅전 禮山 修德寺 大雄殿	Yesan County, South Chungcheong	1962-12-20	
50		Haetalmun Gate of Dogapsa Temple, Yeongam 영암 도갑사 해탈문 靈巖 道岬寺 解脫門	Yeongam County, South Jeolla	1962-12-20	
51		Main Gate of Imyeonggwan Guesthouse, Gangneung 강릉 임영관 삼문 江陵 臨瀛館 三門	Gangneung, Gangwon	1962-12-20	
52		Janggyeongpanjeon Depositories of Haeinsa Temple, Hapcheon 합천 해인사 장경판전 陜川 海印寺 藏經板殿	Hapcheon County, South Gyeongsang	1962-12-20	
53		East Stupa of Yeongoksa Temple, Gurye 구례 연곡사 동 승탑 求禮 鷰谷寺 東 僧塔	Gurye County, South Jeolla	1962-12-20; 2010-12-27 renamed	
54		North Stupa of Yeongoksa Temple, Gurye 구례 연곡사 북 승탑 求禮 鷰谷寺 北 僧塔	Gurye County, South Jeolla	1962-12-20; 2010-12-27 renamed	
55		Palsangjeon Wooden Pagoda of Beopjusa Temple, Boeun 보은 법주사 팔상전 報恩 法住寺 捌相殿	Boeun County, North Chungcheong	1962-12-20	
56		Guksajeon Shrine of Songgwangsa Temple, Suncheon 순천 송광사 국사전 順天 松廣寺 國師殿	Suncheon, South Jeolla	1962-12-20	
57		Stupa of Master Cheolgam at Ssangbongsa Temple, Hwasun 화순 쌍봉사 철감선사탑 和順 雙峯寺 澈鑒禪師塔	Hwasun County, South Jeolla	1962-12-20; 2010-12-27 renamed	
58		Iron Seated Bhaisajyaguru Buddha and Stone Pedestal of Janggoksa Temple, Cheongyang 청양 장곡사 철조약사여래좌상 및 석조대좌 靑陽 長谷寺 鐵造藥師如來坐像 및 石造臺座	Cheongyang County, South Chungcheong	1962-12-20; 2010-06-28 renamed	
59		Stele for State Preceptor Jigwang at Beopcheonsa Temple Site, Wonju 원주 법천사지 지광국사탑비 原州 法泉寺址 智光國師塔碑	Wonju, Gangwon	1962-12-20; 2010-12-27 renamed	
60		Celadon Incense Burner with Lion-shaped Cover 청자 사자형뚜껑 향로 靑磁 獅子形蓋 香爐	Yongsan District, Seoul	1962-12-20	
61		Celadon Ewer in the Shape of a Fish-dragon 청자 어룡형 주전자 靑磁 魚龍形 注子	Yongsan District, Seoul	1962-12-20	
62		Mireukjeon Hall of Geumsansa Temple, Gimje 김제 금산사 미륵전 金堤 金山寺 彌勒殿	Gimje, North Jeolla	1962-12-20	
63		Iron Seated Vairocana Buddha of Dopiansa Temple, Cheorwon 철원 도피안사 철조비로자나불좌상 鐵原 到彼岸寺 鐵造毘盧遮那佛坐像	Cheorwon County, Gangwon	1962-12-20; 2010-06-28 renamed	
64		Stone Lotus Basin of Beopjusa Temple, Boeun 보은 법주사 석련지 報恩 法住寺 石蓮池	Boeun County, North Chungcheong	1962-12-20; 2010-12-27 renamed	
65		Celadon Incense Burner with Girin-shaped Lid 청자 기린형뚜껑 향로 靑磁 麒麟形蓋 香爐	Seongbuk District, Seoul	1962-12-20	
66		Celadon Kundika with Inlaid Willow, Lotus, Reed, and Mandarin Duck Design 청자 상감연지원앙문 정병 靑磁 象嵌蓮池鴛鴦文 淨甁	Seongbuk District, Seoul	1962-12-20	
67		Gakhwangjeon Hall of Hwaeomsa Temple, Gurye 구례 화엄사 각황전 求禮 華嚴寺 覺皇殿	Gurye County, South Jeolla	1962-12-20	
68		Celadon Prunus Vase with Inlaid Cloud and Crane Design 청자 상감운학문 매병 靑磁 象嵌雲鶴文 梅甁	Seongbuk District, Seoul	1962-12-20	
69		Certificate of Meritorious Subject Issued to Sim Ji-baek 심지백 개국원종공신녹권 沈之伯 開國原從功臣錄券	Seo District, Busan	1962-12-20; 2010-08-25 renamed	
70		Hunminjeongeum (The Proper Sounds for the Instruction of the People) 훈민정음 訓民正音	Seongbuk District, Seoul	1962-12-20	
71		Dongguk jeongun (Standard Rhymes of the Eastern State, Volumes 1 and 6) 동국정운 권1, 6 東國正韻 卷一, 六	Seongbuk District, Seoul	1962-12-20; 2010-08-25 renamed	
72		Gilt-bronze Standing Buddha Triad with Inscription of "Gyemi Year" 금동계미명삼존불입상 金銅癸未銘三尊佛立像	Seongbuk District, Seoul	1962-12-20; 2010-06-28 renamed	
73		Portable Shrine of Gilt-bronze Buddha Triad 금동삼존불감 金銅三尊佛龕	Seongbuk District, Seoul	1962-12-20	
74		Celadon Duck-shaped Water Dropper 청자 오리모양 연적 靑磁 鴨形 硯滴	Seongbuk District, Seoul	1962-12-20	
75		Bronze Incense Burner with Silver-inlaid Design of Pyochungsa Temple 표충사 청동 은입사 향완 表忠寺 靑銅 銀入絲 香垸	Miryang, South Gyeongsang	1962-12-20	
76		Nanjung ilgi Drafts of the Imjin War Reports and Letters by Yi Sun-sin 이순신 난중일기 및 서간첩 임진장초 李舜臣 亂中日記 및 書簡帖 壬辰狀草	Asan, South Chungcheong	1962-12-20; 2010-08-25 renamed	
77		Five-story Stone Pagoda in Tamni-ri, Uiseong 의성 탑리리 오층석탑 義城 塔里里 五層石塔	Uiseong County, North Gyeongsang	1962-12-20; 2010-12-27 renamed	
78		Gilt-bronze Pensive Maitreya Bodhisattva 금동미륵보살반가사유상 金銅彌勒菩薩半跏思惟像	Yongsan District, Seoul	1962-12-20; 2010-06-28 renamed	
79		Gold Seated Buddha from Guhwang-dong, Gyeongju 경주 구황동 금제여래좌상 慶州 九黃洞 金製如來坐像	Yongsan District, Seoul	1962-12-20; 2010-06-28 renamed	
80		Gold Standing Buddha from Guhwang-dong, Gyeongju 경주 구황동 금제여래입상 慶州 九黃洞 金製如來立像	Yongsan District, Seoul	1962-12-20; 2010-06-28 renamed	
81		Stone Standing Maitreya Bodhisattva of Gamsansa Temple, Gyeongju 경주 감산사 석조미륵보살입상 慶州 甘山寺 石造彌勒菩薩立像	Yongsan District, Seoul	1962-12-20; 2010-06-28 renamed	
82		Stone Standing Amitabha Buddha of Gamsansa Temple, Gyeongju 경주 감산사 석조아미타여래입상 慶州 甘山寺 石造阿彌陀如來立像	Yongsan District, Seoul	1962-12-20; 2010-06-28 renamed	
83		Gilt-bronze Pensive Maitreya Bodhisattva 금동미륵보살반가사유상 金銅彌勒菩薩半跏思惟像	Yongsan District, Seoul	1962-12-20; 2010-06-28 renamed	
84		Rock-carved Buddha Triad in Yonghyeon-ri, Seosan 서산 용현리 마애여래삼존상 瑞山 龍賢里 磨崖如來三尊像	Seosan, South Chungcheong	1962-12-20; 2010-08-25 renamed	
85		Gilt-bronze Standing Buddha Triad with Inscription of "Sinmyo Year" 금동신묘명삼존불입상 金銅辛卯銘三尊佛立像	Yongsan District, Seoul	1962-12-20; 2010-06-28 renamed	
86		Ten-story Stone Pagoda from Gyeongcheonsa Temple Site, Gaeseong 개성 경천사지 십층석탑 開城 敬天寺址 十層石塔	Yongsan District, Seoul	1962-12-20; 2010-12-27 renamed	
87		Gold Crown and Diadem Ornaments from Geumgwanchong Tomb 금관총 금관 및 금제 관식 金冠塚 金冠 및 金製冠飾	Gyeongju, North Gyeongsang	1962-12-20	
88		Gold Waist Belt from Geumgwanchong Tomb 금관총 금제 허리띠 金冠塚 金製銙帶	Gyeongju, North Gyeongsang	1962-12-20	
89		Gold Buckle from Seogam-ri, Pyeongyang 평양 석암리 금제 띠고리 平壤 石巖里 金製鉸具	Yongsan District, Seoul	1962-12-20	
90		Gold Earrings from Bubuchong Tomb, Gyeongju 경주 부부총 금귀걸이 慶州 夫婦塚 金製耳飾	Yongsan District, Seoul	1962-12-20	
91		Earthenware Funerary Objects in the Shape of a Warrior on Horseback 도기 기마인물형 명기 陶器 騎馬人物形 明器	Yongsan District, Seoul	1962-12-20	
92		Bronze Kundika with Silver-inlaid Willow and Waterfowl Design 청동 은입사 포류수금문 정병 靑銅 銀入絲 蒲柳水禽文 淨甁	Yongsan District, Seoul	1962-12-20	
93		White Porcelain Jar with Grape and Monkey Design in Underglaze Iron 백자 철화포도원숭이문 항아리 白磁 鐵畵葡萄猿文 壺	Yongsan District, Seoul	1962-12-20	
94		Celadon Melon-shaped Bottle 청자 참외모양 병 靑磁 瓜形 甁	Yongsan District, Seoul	1962-12-20	
95		Celadon Incense Burner with Openwork Auspicious-character Design Lid 청자 투각칠보문뚜껑 향로 靑磁 透刻七寶文蓋 香爐	Yongsan District, Seoul	1962-12-20	
96		Celadon Ewer in the Shape of a Turtle-dragon 청자 구룡형 주전자 靑磁 龜龍形 注子	Yongsan District, Seoul	1962-12-20	
97		Celadon Prunus Vase with Incised Lotus and Scroll Design 청자 음각연화당초문 매병 靑磁 陰刻蓮花唐草文 梅甁	Yongsan District, Seoul	1962-12-20	
98		Celadon Jar with Inlaid Peony Design 청자 상감모란문 항아리 靑磁 象嵌牡丹文 壺	Yongsan District, Seoul	1962-12-20	
99		East and West Three-story Stone Pagodas from Galhangsa Temple Site, Gimcheon 김천 갈항사지 동·서 삼층석탑 金泉 葛項寺址 東·西 三層石塔	Yongsan District, Seoul	1962-12-20; 2010-12-27 renamed	
100		Seven-story Stone Pagoda from Namgyewon Temple Site, Gaeseong 개성 남계원지 칠층석탑 開城 南溪院址 七層石塔	Yongsan District, Seoul	1962-12-20; 2010-12-27 renamed	
101		Stupa of State Preceptor Jigwang from Beopcheonsa Temple Site, Wonju 원주 법천사지 지광국사탑 原州 法泉寺址 智光國師塔	Yuseong District, Daejeon	1962-12-20; 2010-12-27 renamed	
102		Stupa of State Preceptor Hongbeop from Jeongtosa Temple Site, Chungju 충주 정토사지 홍법국사탑 忠州 淨土寺址 弘法國師塔	Yongsan District, Seoul	1962-12-20; 2010-12-27 renamed	
103		Twin Lion Stone Lantern of Jungheungsanseong Fortress, Gwangyang 광양 중흥산성 쌍사자 석등 光陽 中興山城 雙獅子 石燈	Buk District, Gwangju	1962-12-20; 2010-12-27 renamed	
104		Stupa of Buddhist Monk Yeomgeo from Heungbeopsa Temple Site, Wonju Presumed 전 원주 흥법사지 염거화상탑 傳 原州 興法寺址 廉居和尙塔	Yongsan District, Seoul	1962-12-20; 2010-12-27 renamed	
105		Three-story Stone Pagoda in Beomhak-ri, Sancheong 산청 범학리 삼층석탑 山淸 泛鶴里 三層石塔	Jinju, South Gyeongsang	1962-12-20; 2010-12-27 renamed	
106		Stele of Amitabha with Inscription of "Gyeyu Year", Offered by Jeon 계유명전씨아미타불비상 癸酉銘全氏阿彌陀佛碑像	Cheongju, North Chungcheong	1962-12-20; 2010-06-28 renamed	
107		White Porcelain Jar with Grape Design in Underglaze Iron 백자 철화포도문 항아리 白磁 鐵畵葡萄文 壺	Seodaemun District, Seoul	1962-12-20	
108		Stele of Buddha Triad and a Thousand Buddhas with Inscription of "Gyeyu Year" 계유명삼존천불비상 癸酉銘三尊千佛碑像	Gongju, South Chungcheong	1962-12-20	
109		Grotto of Amitabha Buddha Triad, Gunwi 군위 아미타여래삼존 석굴 軍威 阿彌陀如來三尊 石窟	Gunwi County, Daegu	1962-12-20; 2010-12-27 renamed	
110		Portrait of Yi Je-hyeon 이제현 초상 李齊賢 肖像	Yongsan District, Seoul	1962-12-20	
111		Portrait of An Hyang 안향 초상 安珦 肖像	Yeongju, North Gyeongsang	1962-12-20	
112		East and West Three-story Stone Pagodas at Gameunsa Temple Site, Gyeongju 경주 감은사지 동·서 삼층석탑 慶州 感恩寺址 東·西 三層石塔	Gyeongju, North Gyeongsang	1962-12-20; 2010-12-27 renamed	
113		Celadon Tube-shaped Bottle with Willow Design in Underglaze Iron 청자 철화양류문 통형 병 靑磁 鐵畵楊柳文 筒形 甁	Yongsan District, Seoul	1962-12-20	
114		Celadon Melon-shaped Bottle with Inlaid Peony and Chrysanthemum Design 청자 상감모란국화문 참외모양 병 靑磁 象嵌牡丹菊花文 瓜形 甁	Yongsan District, Seoul	1962-12-20	
115		Celadon Bowl with Inlaid Scroll Design 청자 상감당초문 완 靑磁 象嵌唐草文 碗	Yongsan District, Seoul	1962-12-20	
116		Celadon Gourd-shaped Ewer with Inlaid Peony Design 청자 상감모란문 표주박모양 주전자 靑磁 象嵌牡丹文 瓢形 注子	Yongsan District, Seoul	1962-12-20	
117		Iron Seated Vairocana Buddha of Borimsa Temple, Jangheung 장흥 보림사 철조비로자나불좌상 長興 寶林寺 鐵造毘盧遮那佛坐像	Jangheung County, South Jeolla	1963-02-21; 2010-06-28 renamed	
118		Gilt-bronze Pensive Maitreya Bodhisattva 금동미륵보살반가사유상 金銅彌勒菩薩半跏思惟像	Yongsan District, Seoul	1964-03-30; 2010-06-28 renamed	
119		Gilt-bronze Standing Buddha with Inscription of "the Seventh Yeonga Year" 금동연가7년명여래입상 金銅延嘉七年銘如來立像	Yongsan District, Seoul	1964-03-30; 2010-06-28 renamed	
120		Bronze Bell of Yongjusa Temple 용주사 동종 龍珠寺 銅鍾	Hwaseong, Gyeonggi	1964-03-30	
121		Hahoe Masks and Byeongsan Masks of Andong 안동 하회탈 및 병산탈 安東 河回탈 및 屛山탈	Andong	1964-03-30	
122		Three-story Stone Pagoda at Jinjeonsa Temple Site, Yangyang 양양 진전사지 삼층석탑 襄陽 陳田寺址 三層石塔	Yangyang County, Gangwon	1966-02-28; 2010-12-27 renamed	
123		Reliquaries from the Five-story Stone Pagoda in Wanggung-ri, Iksan 익산 왕궁리 오층석탑 사리장엄구 益山 王宮里 五層石塔 舍利莊嚴具	Jinju, South Jeolla	1966-07-26	
124		Stone Seated Bodhisattva from Hansongsa Temple Site, Gangneung 강릉 한송사지 석조보살좌상 江陵 寒松寺址 石造菩薩坐像	Chuncheon, Gangwon	1967-06-21; 2010-06-28 renamed	
125		Green-glazed Burial Urn Granite Case 녹유골호 綠釉骨壺	Yongsan District, Seoul	1967-06-21	
126		Reliquaries from the Three-story Stone Pagoda of Bulguksa Temple 불국사 삼층석탑 사리장엄구 佛國寺 三層石塔 舍利莊嚴具	Gyeongju, North Gyeongsang	1967-09-16	
127		Gilt-bronze Standing Avalokitesvara Bodhisattva from Samyang-dong, Seoul 서울 삼양동 금동관음보살입상 서울 三陽洞 金銅觀音菩薩立像	Yongsan District, Seoul	1968-12-19; 2010-06-28 renamed	
128		Gilt-bronze Standing Avalokitesvara Bodhisattva 금동관음보살입상 金銅觀音菩薩立像	Yongsan District, Seoul	1968-12-19	
129		Gilt-bronze Standing Bodhisattva 금동보살입상 金銅菩薩立像	Yongsan District, Seoul	1968-12-19	
130		Five-story Stone Pagoda in Jukjang-ri, Gumi 구미 죽장리 오층석탑 龜尾 竹杖里 五層石塔	Gumi, North Gyeongsang	1968-12-19; 2010-12-27 renamed	
131		Family Register of Hwaryeong-bu Prefecture Written in the Late Goryeo Dynasty 고려말 화령부 호적관련고문서 高麗末和寧府戶籍關聯古文書	Yongsan District, Seoul	1969-11-07; 2010-08-25 renamed	
132		Jingbirok (The Book of Correction) 징비록 懲毖錄	Andong	1969-11-07	
133		Celadon Gourd-shaped Ewer with Lotus Design in Underglaze Copper 청자 동화연화문 표주박모양 주전자 靑磁 銅畵蓮花文 瓢形 注子	Yongsan District, Seoul	1970-12-30	
134		Gilt-bronze Standing Bodhisattva Triad 금동보살삼존입상 金銅菩薩三尊立像	Yongsan District, Seoul	1970-12-30; 2010-06-28 renamed	
135		Album of Genre Paintings by Sin Yun-bok 신윤복필 풍속도 화첩 申潤福筆 風俗圖 畵帖	Seongbuk District, Seoul	1970-12-30	
136		Gilt-bronze Miniature Buddhist Flagpole with Dragon Finial 금동 용두보당 金銅 龍頭寶幢	Yongsan District, Seoul	1971-12-21	
137-1		Bronze Artifacts from Bisan-dong, Daegu 검 및 칼집 부속 劍 및 칼집 附屬	Yongsan District, Seoul	1971-12-21	
137-2		Bronze Artifacts from Bisan-dong, Daegu 투겁창 및 꺾창 투겁槍 및 꺾槍	Yongsan District, Seoul	1971-12-21	
138		Gold Crown and Ornaments from Goryeong Presumed 전 고령 금관 및 장신구 일괄 傳 高靈 金冠 및 裝身具 一括	Yongsan District, Seoul	1971-12-21	
139		Folding Screen of Gunseondo Daoist Immortals by Kim Hong-do 김홍도필 군선도 병풍 金弘道筆 群仙圖 屛風	Yongsan District, Seoul	1971-12-21	
140		Bronze Mirror with Inlaid Mother-of-pearl Floral Design 나전 화문 동경 螺鈿 花文 銅鏡	Yongsan District, Seoul	1971-12-21	
141		Bronze Mirror with Fine Linear Design 정문경 精文鏡	Dongjak District, Seoul	1971-12-21	
142		Dongguk jeongun (Standard Rhymes of the Eastern State) 동국정운 東國正韻	Gwangjin District, Seoul	1972-03-02; 2010-08-25 renamed	
143		Bronze Artifacts from Daegok-ri, Hwasun 화순 대곡리 청동기 일괄 和順 大谷里 靑銅器 一括	Buk District, Gwangju	1972-03-02	
144		Rock-carved Seated Buddha in Wolchulsan Mountain, Yeongam 영암 월출산 마애여래좌상 靈巖 月出山 磨崖如來坐像	Yeongam County, South Jeolla	1972-03-02; 2010-08-25 renamed	
145		Bronze Brazier with Demon Face Decoration 귀면 청동로 鬼面 靑銅爐	Yongsan District, Seoul	1972-06-24	
146		Bronze Bells from Nonsan Presumed 전 논산 청동방울 일괄 傳 論山 靑銅鈴 一括	Yongsan District, Seoul	1973-03-19	
147		Petroglyphs of Cheonjeon-ri, Ulju 울주 천전리 각석 蔚州 川前里 刻石	Ulju County, Ulsan	1973-05-04; 2010-12-27 renamed	
148-1		Sipchil sachan gogeum tongyo (Essentials of Seventeen Dynastic Histories, Volume 16) 십칠사찬고금통요 권16 十七史纂古今通要 卷十六	Gwanak District, Seoul	1973-07-10; 2010-08-25 renamed	
148-2		Sipchil sachan gogeum tongyo (Essentials of Seventeen Dynastic Histories, Volume 17) 십칠사찬고금통요 권17 十七史纂古今通要 卷十七	Seocho District, Seoul	1973-07-10; 2010-08-25 renamed	
149-1		Dongnae seonsaeng gyojeong buksa sangjeol (Commentary on the History of the Northern Dynasties, Volumes 4 and 5) 동래선생교정북사상절 권4, 5 東萊先生校正北史詳節 卷四, 五	Seongbuk District, Seoul	1973-07-10; 2010-08-25 renamed	
149-2		Dongnae seonsaeng gyojeong buksa sangjeol (Commentary on the History of the Northern Dynasties), Volume 6 동래선생교정북사상절 권6 東萊先生校正北史詳節 卷六	Jung District, Seoul	1973-07-10; 2010-08-25 renamed	
150		Songjo pyojeon chongnyu (Collection of Appeals and Letters to the Emperors of the Song Dynasty, Volume 7) 송조표전총류 권7 宋朝表牋總類 卷七	Gwanak District, Seoul	1973-07-10; 2010-08-25 renamed	
151-1		Joseon wangjo sillok (Annals of the Joseon Dynasty) 조선왕조실록 정족산사고본 朝鮮王朝實錄 鼎足山史庫本	Gwanak District, Seoul	1973-12-31; 2010-08-25 renamed	
151-2		Joseon wangjo sillok (Annals of the Joseon Dynasty) 조선왕조실록 태백산사고본 朝鮮王朝實錄 太白山史庫本	Yeonje District, Busan	1973-12-31; 2010-08-25 renamed	
151-3		Joseon wangjo sillok (Annals of the Joseon Dynasty) 조선왕조실록 오대산사고본 朝鮮王朝實錄 五臺山史庫本	Gwanak District, Seoul	1973-12-31; 2010-08-25 renamed	
151-4		Joseon wangjo sillok (Annals of the Joseon Dynasty) 조선왕조실록 적상산사고본 朝鮮王朝實錄 赤裳山史庫本	Seoul	2019-06-26	
151-5		Joseon wangjo sillok (Annals of the Joseon Dynasty) 조선왕조실록 봉모당본 朝鮮王朝實錄 奉謨堂本	Seoul	2019-06-26	
151-6		Joseon wangjo sillok (Annals of the Joseon Dynasty) 조선왕조실록 낙질 및 산엽본 朝鮮王朝實錄 落帙 및 散葉本	Gwanak District, Seoul	1973-12-31; 2019-06-26 변경	
152		Bibyeonsa deungnok (Records of the Border Defense Council) 비변사등록 備邊司謄錄	Gwanak District, Seoul	1973-12-31; 2010-08-25 renamed	
153		Ilseongnok (Daily Records of the Royal Court and Important Officials) 일성록 日省錄	Gwanak District, Seoul	1973-12-31	
154		Gold Diadem Ornaments of King Muryeong 무령왕 금제관식 武寧王 金製冠飾	Gongju, South Chungcheong	1974-07-09	
155		Gold Diadem Ornaments of the Queen Consort of King Muryeong 무령왕비 금제관식 武寧王妃 金製冠飾	Yongsan District, Seoul	1974-07-09	
156		Gold Earrings of King Muryeong 무령왕 금귀걸이 武寧王 金製耳飾	Gongju, South Chungcheong	1974-07-09	
157		Gold Earrings of the Queen Consort of King Muryeong 무령왕비 금귀걸이 武寧王妃 金製耳飾	Gongju, South Chungcheong	1974-07-09	
158		Gold Necklaces of the Queen Consort of King Muryeong 무령왕비 금목걸이 武寧王妃 金製頸飾	Gongju, South Chungcheong	1974-07-09	
159		Gold Hairpin of King Muryeong 무령왕 금제 뒤꽂이 武寧王 金製釵	Gongju, South Chungcheong	1974-07-09	
160		Silver Bracelets of the Queen Consort of King Muryeong 무령왕비 은팔찌 武寧王妃 銀製釧	Gongju, South Chungcheong	1974-07-09	
161		Bronze Mirrors from the Tomb of King Muryeong 무령왕릉 청동거울 일괄 武寧王陵 銅鏡一括	Gongju, South Chungcheong	1974-07-09	
162		Stone Guardian from the Tomb of King Muryeong 무령왕릉 석수 武寧王陵 石獸	Gongju, South Chungcheong	1974-07-09; 2010-06-28 renamed	
163		Buried Memorial Tablet from the Tomb of King Muryeong 무령왕릉 지석 武寧王陵 誌石	Gongju, South Chungcheong	1974-07-09; 2010-08-25 renamed	
164		Headrest of the Queen Consort of King Muryeong 무령왕비 베개 武寧王妃 頭枕	Gongju, South Chungcheong	1974-07-09	
165		Footrest of King Muryeong 무령왕 발받침 武寧王 足座	Gongju, South Chungcheong	1974-07-09	
166		White Porcelain Jar with Plum and Bamboo Design in Underglaze Iron 백자 철화매죽문 항아리 白磁 鐵畵梅竹文 壺	Yongsan District, Seoul	1974-07-09	
167		Celadon Ewer in the Shape of a Human Figure 청자 인물형 주전자 靑磁 人物形 注子	Yongsan District, Seoul	1974-07-09	
168		~~White Porcelain Bottle with Plum and Chrysanthemum Design in Underglaze Copper~~; ~~백자 동화매국문 병~~; ~~白磁 銅畵梅菊文 甁~~	~~Yongsan District, Seoul~~	1974-07-09; 2020-05-30 removed	
169		Celadon Bottle with Bamboo Design in Relief 청자 양각죽절문 병 靑磁 陽刻竹節文 甁	Yongsan District, Seoul	1974-07-09	
170		White Porcelain Lidded Jar with Plum, Bird and Bamboo Design in Underglaze Cobalt Blue 백자 청화매조죽문 유개항아리 白磁 靑畵梅鳥竹文 有蓋壺	Yongsan District, Seoul	1974-07-09	
171		Bronze Lidded Bowl with Silver-inlaid Phoenix Design 청동 은입사 봉황문 합 靑銅 銀入絲 鳳凰文 盒	Yongsan District, Seoul	1974-07-09	
172		Relics Excavated from the Tomb of Lady Jeong 진양군영인정씨묘출토유물 晋陽郡令人鄭氏墓出土遺物	Yongsan District, Seoul	1974-07-09	
173		Celadon Seated Arhat with Paste-on-paste White Dot Design 청자 퇴화점문 나한좌상 靑磁 堆花點文 羅漢坐像	Gangnam District, Seoul	1974-07-09	
174		Gilt-bronze Candlesticks with Inlaid Crystal Ornaments 금동 수정 장식 촛대 金銅 水晶 裝飾 燭臺	Yongsan District, Seoul	1974-07-09	
175		White Porcelain Bowl with Inlaid Lotus and Scroll Design 백자 상감연화당초문 대접 白磁 象嵌蓮花唐草文 大楪	Yongsan District, Seoul	1974-07-09	
176		White Porcelain Jar with Pine and Bamboo Design and Inscription of "the Second Hongchi Year" in Underglaze Cobalt Blue 백자 청화'홍치2년'명 송죽문 항아리 白磁 靑畵'弘治二年'銘 松竹文 立壺	Jung District, Seoul	1974-07-09	
177		Buncheong Placenta Jars with Stamped Chrysanthemum Design 분청사기 인화국화문 태항아리 粉靑沙器 印花菊花文 胎壺	Seongbuk District, Seoul	1974-07-09	
178		Buncheong Flat Bottle with Sgraffito Lotus and Fish Design 분청사기 음각어문 편병 粉靑沙器 陰刻魚文 扁甁	Yongsan District, Seoul	1974-07-09	
179		Buncheong Flat Bottle with Sgraffito Lotus and Fish Design 분청사기 박지연화어문 편병 粉靑沙器 剝地蓮花魚文 扁甁	Gwanak District, Seoul	1974-07-09	
180		Sehando (Winter Scene by Kim Jeong-hui) 김정희필 세한도 金正喜筆 歲寒圖	Yongsan District, Seoul	1974-12-31	
181		Red Certificate Issued to Jang Yang-su 장양수 홍패 張良守 紅牌	Uljin County, North Gyeongsang	1975-10-13	
182		Gilt-bronze Standing Buddha from Seonsan-eup, Gumi 구미 선산읍 금동여래입상 龜尾 善山邑 金銅如來立像	Suseong District, Daegu	1976-04-23; 2010-06-28 renamed	
183		Gilt-bronze Standing Bodhisattva from Seonsan-eup, Gumi 구미 선산읍 금동보살입상 龜尾 善山邑 金銅菩薩立像	Suseong District, Daegu	1976-04-23; 2010-06-28 renamed	
184		Gilt-bronze Standing Bodhisattva from Seonsan-eup, Gumi 구미 선산읍 금동보살입상 龜尾 善山邑 金銅菩薩立像	Suseong District, Daegu	1976-04-23; 2010-06-28 renamed	
185		Transcription of Saddharmapundarika Sutra The Lotus Sutra in Silver on Oak Paper 상지은니묘법연화경 橡紙銀泥妙法蓮華經	Yongsan District, Seoul	1976-04-23; 2010-08-25 renamed	
186		Gilt-bronze Standing Buddha from Sinhwa-ri, Yangpyeong 양평 신화리 금동여래입상 楊平 新花里 金銅如來立像	Yongsan District, Seoul	1976-12-14; 2010-06-28 renamed	
187		Five-story Stone Brick Pagoda in Sanhae-ri, Yeongyang 영양 산해리 오층모전석탑 英陽 山海里 五層模塼石塔	Yeongyang County, North Gyeongsang	1977-08-22; 2010-12-27 renamed	
188		Gold Crown from Cheonmachong 천마총 금관 天馬塚 金冠	Gyeongju, North Gyeongsang	1978-12-07	
189		Gold Cap from Cheonmachong Tomb 천마총 관모 天馬塚 金製冠帽	Gyeongju, North Gyeongsang	1978-12-07	
190		Gold Waist Belt from Cheonmachong Tomb 천마총 금제 허리띠 天馬塚 金製銙帶	Gyeongju, North Gyeongsang	1978-12-07	
191		Gold Crown from the North Mound of Hwangnamdaechong Tomb 황남대총 북분 금관 皇南大塚北墳 金冠	Yongsan District, Seoul	1978-12-07	
192		Gold Waist Belt from the North Mound of Hwangnamdaechong Tomb 황남대총 북분 금제 허리띠 皇南大塚 北墳 金製 銙帶	Yongsan District, Seoul	1978-12-07	
193		Glass Ewer and Cups from the South Mound of the Tomb No. 98, Gyeongju 경주 98호 남분 유리병 및 잔 慶州 九十八號 南墳 琉璃甁 및 盞	Yongsan District, Seoul	1978-12-07	
194		Gold Necklace from the South Mound of Hwangnamdaechong Tomb 황남대총 남분 금목걸이 皇南大塚南墳 金製頸飾	Yongsan District, Seoul	1978-12-07	
195		Long-necked Jar with Clay Figurines 토우장식 장경호 土偶裝飾 長頸壺	Gyeongju and Seoul	1978-12-07	
196		Silla Transcription of Avatamsaka Sutra The Flower Garland Sutra, Zhou Version, in Ink on White Paper, Volumes 1-10 and 44-50 신라백지묵서대방광불화엄경 주본 권1~10, 44~50 新羅白紙墨書大方廣佛花嚴經 周本 卷一~十, 四十四~五十	Yongsan District, Seoul	1979-02-08; 2010-08-25 renamed	
197		Stupa of State Preceptor Bogak at Cheongnyongsa Temple Site, Chungju 충주 청룡사지 보각국사탑 忠州 靑龍寺址 普覺國師塔	Chungju, North Chungcheong	1979-05-22; 2010-12-27 renamed	
198		Jeokseongbi Monument of Silla, Danyang 단양 신라 적성비 丹陽 新羅 赤城碑	Danyang County, North Chungcheong	1979-05-22; 2010-12-27 renamed	
199		Rock-carved Buddhas of Sinseonsa Temple in Danseoksan Mountain, Gyeongju 경주 단석산 신선사 마애불상군 慶州 斷石山 神仙寺 磨崖佛像群	Gyeongju, North Gyeongsang	1979-05-22; 2010-08-25 renamed	
200		Gilt-bronze Standing Bodhisattva 금동보살입상 金銅菩薩立像	Nam District, Busan	1979-04-30	
201		Rock-carved Seated Buddha in Bukji-ri, Bonghwa 봉화 북지리 마애여래좌상 奉化 北枝里 磨崖如來坐像	Bonghwa County, North Gyeongsang	1980-09-16	
202		Avatamsaka Sutra The Flower Garland Sutra, Jin Version, Volume 37 대방광불화엄경 진본 권37 大方廣佛華嚴經 晋本 卷三十七	Seodaemun District, Seoul	1981-03-18; 2010-08-25 renamed	
203		Avatamsaka SutraThe Flower Garland Sutra, Zhou Version, Volume 6 대방광불화엄경 주본 권6 大方廣佛華嚴經 周本 卷六	Jung District, Seoul	1981-03-18; 2010-08-25 renamed	
204		Avatamsaka Sutra The Flower Garland Sutra, Zhou Version, Volume 36 대방광불화엄경 주본 권36 大方廣佛華嚴經 周本 卷三十六	Jung District, Seoul	1981-03-18; 2010-08-25 renamed	
205		Goguryeo Monument, Chungju 충주 고구려비 忠州 高句麗碑	Chungju, North Chungcheong	1981-03-18; 2010-12-27 renamed	
206		Printing Woodblocks of Miscellaneous Buddhist Scriptures in Haeinsa Temple, Hapcheon 합천 해인사 고려목판 陜川 海印寺 高麗木板	Hapcheon County, South Gyeongsang	1982-05-22	
207		Jangni cheonmado Painting of Heavenly Horse on a Saddle Flap from Cheonmachong Tomb, Gyeongju 경주 천마총 장니 천마도 慶州 天馬塚 障泥 天馬圖	Gyeongju, North Gyeongsang	1982-11-16	
208		Gilt-bronze Reliquary from Sakyamuni Stupa of Dorisa Temple 도리사 세존사리탑 금동 사리기 桃李寺 世尊舍利塔 金銅舍利器	Gimcheon, North Gyeongsang	1982-12-07	
209		Stone Pagoda of Casket Seal Dharani 보협인석탑 寶篋印石塔	Jung District, Seoul	1982-12-07	
210		Transcription of Amoghapasha kalparaja Sutra Infallible Lasso's Mantra and Supernatural Transformations : King of Ritual Manuals in Silver on Indigo Paper, Volume 13 감지은니불공견삭신변진언경 권13 紺紙銀泥不空羂索紳變眞言經 卷十三	Yongsan District, Seoul	1984-05-30; 2010-08-25 renamed	
211		Transcription of Saddharmapundarika Sutra The Lotus Sutra in Ink on White Paper 백지묵서묘법연화경 白紙墨書妙法蓮華經	Gwanak District, Seoul	1984-05-30; 2010-08-25 renamed	
212		Shurangama Sutra The Sutra of the Heroic One, Korean Translation 대불정여래밀인수증료의제보살만행수능엄경(언해) 大佛頂如來密因修證了義諸菩薩行首楞嚴經諺解	Jung District, Seoul	1984-05-30; 2010-08-25 renamed	
213		Gilt-bronze Miniature Pagoda 금동탑 金銅塔	Yongsan District, Seoul	1984-08-06	
214		Bronze Incense Burner with Inscription of "Heungwangsa Temple" and Silver-inlaid Design 흥왕사명 청동 은입사 향완 興王寺銘 靑銅 銀入絲 香垸	Yongsan District, Seoul	1984-08-06	
215		Transcription of Avatamsaka SutraThe Flower Garland Sutra, Zhenyuan Version, in Silver on Indigo Paper, Volume 31 감지은니대방광불화엄경 정원본 권31 紺紙銀泥大方廣佛華嚴經 貞元本 卷三十一	Yongsan District, Seoul	1984-08-06; 2010-08-25 renamed	
216		Inwang jesaekdoScene of Inwangsan Mountain After Rain by Jeong Seon 정선필 인왕제색도 鄭敾筆 仁王霽色圖	Yongsan District, Seoul	1984-08-06	
217		Geumgang jeondoComplete View of Geumgangsan Mountain by Jeong Seon 정선필 금강전도 鄭敾筆 金剛全圖	Yongsan District, Seoul	1984-08-06	
218		Painting of Amitabha Buddha Triad 아미타삼존도 阿彌陀三尊圖	Yongsan District, Seoul	1984-08-06	
219		White Porcelain Jar with Plum and Bamboo Design in Underglaze Cobalt Blue 백자 청화매죽문 항아리 白磁 靑畵梅竹文 立壺	Yongsan District, Seoul	1984-08-06	
220		Celadon Lidded Bowl and Saucer with Inlaid Dragon, Phoenix, and Peony Design 청자 상감용봉모란문 합 및 탁 靑磁 象嵌龍鳳牡丹文 盒 및 托	Yongsan District, Seoul	1984-08-06	
221		Wooden Seated Child Manjusri of Sangwonsa Temple 평창 상원사 목조문수동자좌상 평창 上院寺 木造文殊童子坐像	Pyeongchang County, Gangwon	1984-10-15; 2010-06-28 renamed	
222		White Porcelain Lidded Jar with Plum and Bamboo Design in Underglaze Cobalt Blue 백자 청화매죽문 유개항아리 白磁 靑畵梅竹文 有蓋立壺	Gwanak District, Seoul	1984-12-07	
223		Geunjeongjeon Hall of Gyeongbokgung Palace 경복궁 근정전 景福宮 勤政殿	Jongno District, Seoul	1985-01-08	
224		Gyeonghoeru Pavilion of Gyeongbokgung Palace 경복궁 경회루 景福宮 慶會樓	Jongno District, Seoul	1985-01-08	
225		Injeongjeon Hall of Changdeokgung Palace 창덕궁 인정전 昌德宮 仁政殿	Jongno District, Seoul	1985-01-08	
226		Myeongjeongjeon Hall of Changgyeonggung Palace 창경궁 명정전 昌慶宮 明政殿	Jongno District, Seoul	1985-01-08	
227		Main Hall of Jongmyo Shrine 종묘 정전 宗廟 正殿	Jongno District, Seoul	1985-01-08	
228		Celestial Chart Stone 천상열차분야지도 각석 天象列次分野之圖 刻石	Jongno District, Seoul	1985-08-09	
229		Clepsydra of Changgyeonggung Palace 창경궁 자격루 昌慶宮 自擊漏	Jung District, Seoul	1985-08-09	
230		Celestial Globe and Armillary Clock 혼천의 및 혼천시계 渾天儀 및 渾天時計	Seongbuk District, Seoul	1985-08-09	
231		Bronze Age Moulds from Yeongam Presumed 전 영암 거푸집 일괄 傳 靈巖 鎔范一括	Dongjak District, Seoul	1986-03-14	
232		Certificate of Meritorious Subject Issued to Yi Hwa 이화 개국공신녹권 李和 開國功臣錄券	Jeongeup, North Jeolla	1986-10-15; 2010-08-25 renamed	
233-1		Stone Seated Vairocana Buddha from Seongnamamsa Temple Site, Sancheong 산청 석남암사지 석조비로자나불좌상 山淸 石南巖寺址 石造毘盧遮那佛坐像	Sancheong County, South Gyeongsang	2016-01-07	
233-2		Agalmatolite Reliquary from the Stone Seated Vairocana Buddha from Seongnamamsa Temple Site, Sancheong 산청 석남암사지 석조비로자나불좌상 납석사리호 山淸 石南巖寺址 石造毘盧遮那坐像 蠟石舍利壺	Nam District, Busan	1986-10-15; 2016-07-01명칭 및 번호 변경	
234		Transcription of Saddharmapundarika Sutra The Lotus Sutra in Silver on Indigo Paper 감지은니묘법연화경 紺紙銀泥妙法蓮華經	Yongsan District, Seoul	1986-11-29; 2010-08-25 renamed	
235		Transcription of Avatamsaka SutraThe Flower Garland Sutra in Gold on Indigo Paper 감지금니대방광불화엄경보현행원품 紺紙金泥大方廣佛華嚴經普賢行願品	Yongsan District, Seoul	1986-11-29	
236		West Five-story Stone Pagoda in Janghang-ri, Gyeongju 경주 장항리 서 오층석탑 慶州 獐項里 西 五層石塔	Gyeongju, North Gyeongsang	1987-03-09; 2010-12-27 renamed	
237		Folding Screen of Gosan gugok sihwadoPoems and Paintings of the Nine Scenic Valleys of Gosan 고산구곡시화도 병풍 高山九曲詩畵圖 屛風	Jongno District, Seoul	1987-07-16	
238		Sowon hwagaecheop Calligraphy by Grand Prince Anpyeong 소원화개첩 小苑花開帖	Jongno District, Seoul	1987-07-16	
239		Portrait of Song Si-yeol 송시열 초상 宋時烈 肖像	Yongsan District, Seoul	1987-12-26	
240		Self-portrait by Yun Du-seo 윤두서 자화상 尹斗緖 自畵像	Haenam County, South Jeolla	1987-12-26	
241		Maha prajnaparamita Sutra Perfection of Transcendental Wisdom, the First Tripitaka Koreana Edition, Volume 249 초조본 대반야바라밀다경 권249 初雕本 大般若波羅蜜多經 卷二百四十九	Yongin, Gyeonggi	1988-06-16; 2010-08-25 renamed	
242		Silla Monument in Bongpyeong-ri, Uljin 울진 봉평리 신라비 蔚珍 鳳坪里 新羅碑	Uljin County, North Gyeongsang	1988-11-04; 2010-12-27 renamed	
243		Prakaranaryavaca Sastra Acclamation of the Holy Teaching, the First Tripitaka Koreana Edition, Volume 11 초조본 현양성교론 권11 初雕本 顯揚聖敎論 卷十一	Yongsan District, Seoul	1988-12-28; 2010-08-25 renamed	
244		Yogacarabhumi Sastra Discourse on the Stages of Yogic Practice, the First Tripitaka Koreana Edition, Volume 17 초조본 유가사지론 권17 初雕本 瑜伽師地論 卷第十七	Yongin, Gyeonggi	1988-12-28; 2010-08-25 renamed	
245		Index of Tripitaka, the First Tripitaka Koreana Edition, Volume 20 초조본 신찬일체경원품차록 권20 初雕本 新纘一切經源品次綠 卷二十	Yongsan District, Seoul	1988-12-28; 2010-08-25 renamed	
246		Maharatnakuta Sutra Sutra of the Great Accumulation of Treasures, the First Tripitaka Koreana Edition, Volume 59 초조본 대보적경 권59 初雕本 大寶積經 卷五十九	Yongsan District, Seoul	1988-12-28; 2010-08-25 renamed	
247		Gilt-bronze Standing Bodhisattva from Uidang-myeon, Gongju 공주의당금동보살입상 公州儀堂金銅菩薩立像	Gongju, South Chungcheong	1989-04-10	
248		Joseon bangyeok jido Map of the Korean Territory 조선방역지도 朝鮮方域之圖	Gwacheon, Gyeonggi	1989-08-01	
249-1		Donggwoldo (The Eastern Palaces) 동궐도 東闕圖	Seongbuk District, Seoul	1989-08-01; 2012-11-13 번호변경	
249-2		Donggwoldo (The Eastern Palaces) 동궐도 東闕圖	Seo District, Busan	1989-08-01; 2012-11-13 번호변경	
250		Certificate of Meritorious Subject Issued to Yi Won-gil 이원길 개국원종공신녹권 李原吉 開國原從功臣錄券	Seodaemun District, Seoul	1989-08-01; 2010-08-25 renamed	
251		Mahayana abhidharma samucchaya vyakhya Collection of the Mahayana Abhidharma, the First Tripitaka Koreana Edition, Volume 14 초조본 대승아비달마잡집론 권14 初雕本 大乘阿毗達磨雜集論 卷十四	Seodaemun District, Seoul	1989-08-01; 2010-08-25 renamed	
252		Celadon Prunus Vase with Incised Lotus Design and Inscription of "Hyomun" 청자 음각'효문'명 연화문 매병 靑磁 陰刻'孝文'銘 蓮花文 梅甁	Yongsan District, Seoul	1990-05-21	
253		Celadon Bowl with Silver Lip, Lotus and Scroll Design in Relief, and Inlaid Peony Design 청자 양각연화당초상감모란문 은테 발 靑磁 陽刻蓮花唐草象嵌牡丹文 銀釦 鉢	Yongsan District, Seoul	1990-05-21	
254		Celadon Lidded Prunus Vase with Incised Lotus Design 청자 음각연화문 유개매병 靑磁 陰刻蓮花文 有蓋梅甁	Seocho District, Seoul	1990-05-21	
255		Bronze Bells from Deoksan Presumed 전 덕산 청동방울 일괄 傳 德山 靑銅鈴一括	Yongsan District, Seoul	1990-05-21	
256		Avatamsaka Sutra The Flower Garland Sutra, Zhou Version, the First Tripitaka Koreana Edition, Volume 1 초조본 대방광불화엄경 주본 권1 初雕本 大方廣佛華嚴經 周本 卷一	Yongin, Gyeonggi	1990-09-20; 2010-08-25 renamed	
257		Avatamsaka Sutra The Flower Garland Sutra, Zhou Version, the First Tripitaka Koreana Edition, Volume 29 초조본 대방광불화엄경 주본 권29 初雕本 大方廣佛華嚴經 周本 卷二十九	Danyang County, North Chungcheong	1990-09-20; 2010-08-25 renamed	
258		White Porcelain Octagonal Bottle with Bamboo Design in Underglaze Cobalt Blue 백자 청화죽문 각병 白磁 靑畵竹文 角甁	Yongsan District, Seoul	1991-01-25	
259		Buncheong Jar with Inlaid Cloud and Dragon Design 분청사기 상감운룡문 항아리 粉靑沙器 象嵌雲龍文 立壺	Yongsan District, Seoul	1991-01-25	
260		Buncheong Turtle-shaped Bottle with Sgraffito Peony Design in Underglaze Iron 분청사기 박지철채모란문 자라병 粉靑沙器 剝地鐵彩牡丹文 扁甁	Yongsan District, Seoul	1991-01-25	
261		White Porcelain Lidded Jar 백자 유개항아리 白磁 有蓋壺	Yongsan District, Seoul	1991-01-25	
262		White Porcelain Moon Jar 백자 달항아리 白磁 壺	Yongin, Gyeonggi	1991-01-25	
263		White Porcelain Jar with Landscape, Flower and Bird Design in Underglaze Cobalt Blue 백자 청화산수화조문 항아리 白磁 靑畵山水花鳥文 立壺	Yongin, Gyeonggi	1991-01-25	
264		Silla Monument in Naengsu-ri, Pohang 포항 냉수리 신라비 浦項 冷水里 新羅碑	Pohang, North Gyeongsang	1991-03-15; 2010-12-27 renamed	
265		Avatamsaka Sutra The Flower Garland Sutra, Zhou Version, the First Tripitaka Koreana Edition, Volume 13 초조본 대방광불화엄경 주본 권13 初雕本 大方廣佛華嚴經 周本 卷十三	Jongno District, Seoul	1991-07-12; 2010-08-25 renamed	
266		Avatamsaka Sutra The Flower Garland Sutra, Zhou Version, the First Tripitaka Koreana Edition, Volumes 2 and 75 초조본 대방광불화엄경 주본 권2,75 初雕本 大方廣佛華嚴經 周本 卷二, 七十五	Gwanak District, Seoul	1991-07-12; 2010-08-25 renamed	
267		Abhidharma vijnana kaya pada Sastra Discourse on Consciousness Body, the First Tripitaka Koreana Edition, Volume 12 초조본 아비달마식신족론 권12 初雕本 阿毗達磨識身足論 卷十二	Gwanak District, Seoul	1991-07-12; 2010-08-25 renamed	
268		Abhidharma vibhasa Sastra Explanatory of the Abhidharma, the First Tripitaka Koreana Edition, Volumes 11 and 17 초조본 아비담비파사론 권11, 17 初雕本 阿毗曇毗婆沙論 卷十一, 十七	Gwanak District, Seoul	1991-07-12; 2010-08-25 renamed	
269		Ardhasatika prajnaparamita Sutra, the First Tripitaka Koreana Edition, Volume 6 초조본 불설최상근본대락금강불공삼매대교왕경 권6 初雕本 佛說最上根本大樂金剛不空三昧大敎王經 卷六	Gwanak District, Seoul	1991-07-12; 2010-08-25 renamed	
270		Celadon Water Dropper in the Shape of Mother and Baby Monkeys 청자 모자원숭이모양 연적 靑磁 母子猿形 硯滴	Seongbuk District, Seoul	1992-04-20	
271		Prakaranaryavaca Sastra Acclamation of the Holy Teaching, the First Tripitaka Koreana Edition, Volume 12 초조본 현양성교론 권12 初雕本 顯揚聖敎論 卷十二	Yongsan District, Seoul	1992-04-20; 2010-08-25 renamed	
272		Yogacarabhumi Sastra Discourse on the Stages of Yogic Practice, the First Tripitaka Koreana Edition, Volume 32 초조본 유가사지론 권32 初雕本 瑜伽師地論 卷三十二	Yongsan District, Seoul	1992-04-20; 2010-08-25 renamed	
273		Yogacarabhumi Sastra Discourse on the Stages of Yogic Practice, the First Tripitaka Koreana Edition, Volume 15 초조본 유가사지론 권15 初雕本 瑜伽師地論 卷十五	Yongsan District, Seoul	1992-07-28; 2010-08-25 renamed	
~~274~~		~~Gwihambyeolhwangja Rifle Barrel~~; ~~귀함별황자총통~~; ~~龜艦別黃字銃筒1596年造~~	~~Changwon, South Gyeongsang~~	1992-09-04; 1996-08-31 removed	
275		Earthenware Horn Cup in the Shape of a Warrior on Horseback 도기 기마인물형 뿔잔 陶器 騎馬人物形 角杯	Gyeongju, North Gyeongsang	1993-01-15	
276		Yogacarabhumi Sastra Discourse on the Stages of Yogic Practice, the First Tripitaka Koreana Edition, Volume 53 초조본 유가사지론 권53 初雕本 瑜伽師地論 卷五十三	Yeonsu District, Incheon	1993-04-27; 2010-08-25 renamed	
277		Avatamsaka Sutra The Flower Garland Sutra, Zhou Version, the First Tripitaka Koreana Edition, Volume 36 초조본 대방광불화엄경 주본 권36 初雕本 大方廣佛華嚴經 周本 卷三十六	Wonju, Gangwon	1993-04-27; 2010-08-25 renamed	
~~278~~		~~Certificate of Annual Stipend Issued to Yi Hyeong for His Meritorious Deeds in the 11th Year of the King Taejong's Reign~~; ~~태종11년이형원종공신록권부함~~; ~~太宗十一年李衡原從功臣錄券附函~~	~~Yeongdong County, North Chungcheong~~	1993-04-27; 2010-08-25 removed	
279		Avatamsaka Sutra The Flower Garland Sutra, Zhou Version, the First Tripitaka Koreana Edition, Volume 74 초조본 대방광불화엄경 주본 권74 初雕本 大方廣佛華嚴經 周本 卷七十四	Danyang County, North Chungcheong	1993-06-15; 2010-08-25 renamed	
280		Bronze Bell with Inscription of "Cheonheungsa Temple" in Seonggeosan Mountain 성거산 천흥사명 동종 聖居山天興寺銘銅鍾	Yongsan District, Seoul	1993-09-10	
281		White Porcelain Bottle-shaped Ewer 백자 병형 주전자 白磁 甁形 注子	Gwanak District, Seoul	1993-09-10	
282		Wooden Seated Amitabha Buddha and Excavated Relics of Heukseoksa Temple, Yeongju 영주 흑석사 목조아미타여래좌상 및 복장유물 榮州 黑石寺 木造阿彌陀如來 坐像 및 腹藏遺物	Yeongju, North Gyeongsang	1993-11-05; 2010-06-28 renamed	
283		Tonggam sokpyeon Supplement to the Comprehensive Mirror for Aid in Government 통감속편 通鑑續編	Seongnam, Gyeonggi	1995-03-10	
284		Maha prajnaparamita Sutra Perfection of Transcendental Wisdom, the First Tripitaka Koreana Edition, Volumes 162, 170, and 463 초조본 대반야바라밀다경 권162, 170, 463 初雕本 大般若波羅蜜多經 卷一百六二, 一百七十, 四百六十三	Gangnam District, Seoul	1995-03-10; 2010-08-25 renamed	
285		Petroglyphs of Bangudae Terrace in Daegok-ri, Ulju 울주 대곡리 반구대 암각화 蔚州 大谷里 盤龜臺 岩刻畫	Ulsan	1995-06-23; 2010-12-27 renamed	
286		White Porcelain Bowls with Inscription of "Cheon 天," "Ji 地," "Hyeon 玄," and "Hwang 黃" 백자 '천' '지' '현' '황'명 발 白磁 天地玄黃銘 鉢	Yongsan District, Seoul	1995-12-04	
287		Great Gilt-bronze Incense Burner of Baekje 백제 금동대향로 百濟金銅大香爐	Buyeo County, South Chungcheong	1996-05-30	
288		Stone Reliquary from Temple Site in Neungsan-ri, Buyeo 부여 능산리사지 석조사리감 扶餘 陵山里寺址 石造舍利龕	Buyeo County, South Chungcheong	1996-05-30	
289		Five-story Stone Pagoda in Wanggung-ri, Iksan 익산 왕궁리 오층석탑 益山 王宮里 五層石塔	Iksan, North Jeolla	1997-01-01; 2010-12-27 renamed	
290		Daeungjeon Hall and Ordination Platform of Tongdosa Temple, Yangsan 양산 통도사 대웅전 및 금강계단 梁山 通度寺 大雄殿 및 金剛戒壇	Yangsan, South Gyeongsang	1997-01-01	
291		Yonggamsugyeong (The Handy Mirror in the Dragon Shrine, Volumes 3 and 4) 용감수경 권3~4 龍龕手鏡 卷三~四	Seongbuk District, Seoul	1997-01-01; 2010-08-25 renamed	
292		Documents of Sangwonsa Temple, Pyeongchang 평창 상원사 중창권선문 平昌 上院寺 重創勸善文	Pyeongchang County, Gangwon	1997-01-01; 2010-08-25 renamed	
293		Gilt-bronze Standing Avalokitesvara Bodhisattva from Gyuam-ri, Buyeo 부여 규암리 금동관음보살입상 扶餘 窺岩里 金銅觀音菩薩立像	Buyeo County, South Chungcheong	1997-01-01; 2010-06-28 renamed	
294		White Porcelain Bottle with Grass and Insect Design in Underglaze Iron, Copper, and Cobalt Blue 백자 청화철채동채초충문 병 白磁 靑畵鐵彩銅彩草蟲文 甁	Seongbuk District, Seoul	1997-01-01	
295		Gilt-bronze Crown from Sinchon-ri, Naju 나주 신촌리 금동관 羅州 新村里 金銅冠	Naju, South Jeolla	1997-09-22	
296		Hanging Painting of Chiljangsa Temple Five Buddhas 칠장사오불회괘불탱 七長寺五佛會掛佛幀	Anseong, Gyeonggi	1997-09-22	
297		Hanging Painting of Ansimsa Temple The Vulture Peak Assembly 안심사 영산회 괘불탱 安心寺 靈山會 掛佛幀	Cheongwon County, North Chungcheong	1997-09-22	
298		Hanging Painting of Gapsa Temple Buddha Triad 갑사삼신불괘불탱 甲寺三身佛掛佛幀	Gongju, South Chungcheong	1997-09-22	
299		Hanging Painting of Sinwonsa Temple Rocana Buddha 신원사노사나불괘불탱 新元寺盧舍那佛掛佛幀	Gongju, South Chungcheong	1997-09-22	
300		Hanging Painting of Janggoksa Temple Maitreya Buddha 장곡사미륵불괘불탱 長谷寺彌勒佛掛佛幀	Cheongyang County, South Chungcheong	1997-09-22	
301		Hanging Painting of Hwaeomsa Temple The Vulture Peak Assembly 화엄사영산회괘불탱 華嚴寺靈山會掛佛幀	Gurye County, South Jeolla	1997-09-22	
302		Hanging Painting of Cheonggoksa Temple The Vulture Peak Assembly 청곡사영산회괘불탱 靑谷寺靈山會掛佛幀	Jinju, South Gyeongsang	1997-09-22	
303		Seungjeongwon ilgi (Diaries of the Royal Secretariat) 승정원일기 承政院日記	Gwanak District, Seoul	1999-04-09	
304		Jinnamgwan Hall, Yeosu 여수 진남관 麗水 鎭南館	Yeosu, South Jeolla	2001-04-17	
305		Sebyeonggwan Hall, Tongyeong 통영 세병관 統營 洗兵館	Tongyeong, South Gyeongsang	2002-10-14	
306		Samguk yusa (Memorabilia of the Three Kingdoms, Volumes 3–5) 삼국유사 권3~5 三國遺事 卷三~五	Jongno District, Seoul	2003-02-03; 2010-08-25 renamed	
306-2		Samguk yusa (Memorabilia of the Three Kingdoms) 삼국유사 三國遺事	Gwanak District, Seoul	2003-04-14; 2010-08-25 renamed	
306-3		Samguk yusa (Memorabilia of the Three Kingdoms, Volumes 1–2) 삼국유사 권1~2 三國遺事 卷一~二	Seodaemun District, Seoul	2018-02-22	
307		Rock-carved Standing Buddha Triad in Dongmun-ri, Taean 태안 동문리 마애삼존불입상 泰安 東門里 磨崖三尊佛立像	Taean County, South Chungcheong	2004-08-31; 2010-08-25 renamed	
308		Rock-carved Seated Buddha at Bungmireugam Hermitage of Daeheungsa Temple, Haenam 해남 대흥사 북미륵암 마애여래좌상 海南 大興寺 北彌勒庵 磨崖如來坐像	Haenam County, South Jeolla	2005-09-28; 2010-08-25 renamed	
309		White Porcelain Moon Jar 백자 달항아리 (국보 제309호)백자 달항아리 白磁 壺	Yongsan District, Seoul	2007-12-17	
310		White Porcelain Moon Jar 백자 달항아리 (국보 제310호)백자 달항아리 白磁 壺	Jongno District, Seoul	2007-12-17	
311		Daeungjeon Hall of Bongjeongsa Temple, Andong 안동 봉정사 대웅전 安東 鳳停寺 大雄殿	Andong, North Gyeongsang	2009-06-30	
312		Rock-carved Buddhas at Chilburam Hermitage in Namsan Mountain, Gyeongju 경주 남산 칠불암 마애불상군 慶州 南山 七佛庵 磨崖佛像群	Gyeongju, North Gyeongsang	2009-09-02	
313		Mural Painting in Geungnakjeon Hall of Muwisa Temple, Gangjin Amitabha Buddha Triad 강진 무위사 극락전 아미타여래삼존벽화 康津 無爲寺 極樂殿 阿彌陀如來三尊壁畵	Gangjin County, South Jeolla	2009-09-02	
314		Buddhist Painting of Songgwangsa Temple, Suncheon Illustration of the Avatamsaka Sutra 순천 송광사 화엄경변상도 順天 松廣寺 華嚴經變相圖	Suncheon, South Jeolla	2009-09-02	
315		Stele for Buddhist Monk Jijeung at Bongamsa Temple, Mungyeong 문경 봉암사 지증대사탑비 聞慶 鳳巖寺 智證大師塔碑	Mungyeong, North Gyeongsang	2010-01-04; 2010-12-27 renamed	
316		Geungnakjeon Hall of Hwaamsa Temple, Wanju 완주 화암사 극락전 完州 花巖寺 極樂殿	Wanju County, North Jeolla	2011-11-28	
317		Portrait of King Taejo of Joseon 조선태조어진 朝鮮太祖御眞	Jinju, South Jeolla	2012-06-29	
318		Silla Monument in Naengsu-ri, Pohang 포항 중성리 신라비 浦項 中城里 新羅碑	Gyeongju, North Gyeongsang	2015-04-22	
319-1		Dongui Bogam 동의보감 東醫寶鑑	Seocho District, Seoul	2015-06-22	
319-2		Dongui Bogam 동의보감 東醫寶鑑	Seongnam, Gyeonggi	2015-06-22	
319-3		Dongui Bogam 동의보감 東醫寶鑑	Gwanak District, Seoul	2015-06-22	
320		Worin cheongangjigok Songs of the Moon's Reflection on a Thousand Rivers, Volume 1 월인천강지곡 권상 月印千江之曲 卷上	Seongnam, Gyeonggi	2017-01-02	
321		Wooden Amitabha Buddha Altarpiece of Daeseungsa Temple, Mungyeong 문경 대승사 목각아미타여래설법상 聞慶 大乘寺 木刻阿彌陀如來說法像	Mungyeong, North Gyeongsang	2017-08-31	
322-1		Samguk sagi 삼국사기 三國史記	Gyeongju, North Gyeongsang	2018-02-22	
322-2		Samguk sagi 삼국사기 三國史記	Jung District, Seoul	2018-02-22	
323		Stone constraction of the standing statue of Maitreya Bodhisattva in Gwanchoksa Temple, Nonsan 논산 관촉사 석조미륵보살입상 論山 灌燭寺 石造彌勒菩薩立像	Nonsan, South Chungcheong	2018-04-20	
324		Royal Certificate of Meritorious Subject Issued to Yi Je 이제 개국공신교서 李濟 開國功臣敎書	Sancheong County, South Gyeongsang	2018-06-27	
325		Gisa gyecheop Album of Paintings of the Gathering of Elders 기사계첩 (국보 제325호)기사계첩 耆社契帖	Yongsan District, Seoul	2019-03-06	
326		Celadon Jar with Inscription of 'the Fourth Sunhwa Year' 청자 순화4년명 항아리 靑磁 淳化四年銘 壺	Seodaemun District, Seoul	2019-05-02	
327		Reliquary from Wangheungsa Temple Site, Buyeo 부여 왕흥사지 출토 사리기 扶餘 王興寺址 出土 舍利器	Buyeo County, South Chungcheong	2019-06-26	
328		Rotating Sutra Case of Yongmunsa Temple, Yecheon 예천 용문사 대장전과 윤장대 醴泉 龍門寺 大藏殿과 輪藏臺	Yecheon County, North Gyeongsang	2019-12-02	
329		Rain Gauge of Chungcheong Provincial Office, Gongju 공주 충청감영 측우기 公州 忠淸監營 測雨器	Dongjak District, Seoul	2020-02-27	
330		Rain Gauge Pedestal from the Gyeongsang-do Provincial Office in Daegu 대구 경상감영 측우대 大邱 慶尙監營 測雨臺	Dongjak District, Seoul	2020-02-27	
331		Rain Gauge Pedestal of Imunwon Hall 창덕궁 이문원 측우대 昌德宮 摛文院 測雨臺	Jongno District, Seoul	2020-02-27	
332		Sumanotap Pagoda of Jeongamsa Temple, Jeongseon 정선 정암사 수마노탑 旌善 淨岩寺 水瑪瑙塔	Jeongseon County, Gangwon	2020-06-25	
333		Dry-lacquered Seated Statue of Buddhist Monk Huirang at Haeinsa Temple, Hapcheon 합천 해인사 건칠희랑대사좌상 陜川 海印寺 乾漆希朗大師坐像	Hapcheon County, South Gyeongsang	2020-10-21	
334		Gisa gyecheop and case (Album of Paintings of the Gatherings of Elders) and Case 기사계첩 및 함 耆社契帖및 函	Asan, South Chungcheong	2020-12-22	
335		Scroll of Oath-taking Rites by 20 Meritorious Subjects 이십공신회맹축-보사공신녹훈후 二十功臣會盟軸-保社功臣錄勳後	Seongnam, Gyeonggi	2021-02-17	
336		Wooden Seated Vairocana Buddha Triad of Hwaeomsa Temple in Gurye 구례 화엄사 목조비로자나삼신불좌상 求禮 華嚴寺 木造毘盧遮那三身佛坐像	Gurye County, South Jeolla	2021-06-23	
List of items added following the removal of the numbering system
		Gilt-bronze Seated Bhaisajyaguru Buddha and Enshrined Votive Offerings of Janggoksa Temple in Cheongyang 청양 장곡사 금동약사여래좌상 및 복장유물 靑陽 長谷寺 金銅藥師如來坐像 및 腹藏遺物	Cheongyang County, South Chungcheong	2022-06-23	
		Wooden Seated Vairocana Buddha and Enshrined Votive Offerings in Beopbojeon Hall of Haeinsa Temple, Hapcheon 합천 해인사 법보전 목조비로자나불좌상 및 복장유물 陜川 海印寺 法寶殿 木造毘盧遮那佛坐像 및 腹藏遺物	Hapcheon County, South Gyeongsang	2022-10-26	
		Wooden Seated Vairocana Buddha and Enshrined Votive Offerings in Daejeokgwangjeon Hall of Haeinsa Temple in Hapcheon 합천 해인사 대적광전 목조비로자나불좌상 및 복장유물 陜川 海印寺 大寂光殿 木造毘盧遮那佛坐像 腹藏遺物	Hapcheon County, South Gyeongsang	2022-10-26	
		The Sarira Reliquaries of the West Pagoda at the Mireuksa Temple Site, Iksan 익산 미륵사지 서탑 출토 사리장엄구 益山 彌勒寺址 西塔 出土 舍利莊嚴具	Iksan, North Jeolla	2022-12-27	
		Long sword by Yi Sun-sin 이순신 장검 李舜臣 長劍	Asan, South Chungcheong	2023-08-24	
		Bronze Bell of Naesosa Temple in Buan 부안 내소사 동종 扶安 來蘇寺 銅鍾	Buan County, North Jeolla	2023-12-26	
		Jukseoru Pavilion, Samcheok 삼척 죽서루 三陟 竹西樓	Samcheok, Gangwon	2023-12-28	
		Yeongnamnu Pavilion, Miryang 밀양 영남루 密陽 嶺南樓	Miryang, South Gyeongsang	2023-12-28	
		순천 송광사 영산회상도 및 팔상도 順天 松廣寺 靈山會上圖 및 八相圖	Suncheon, South Jeolla	2024-05-27	
		Buddhist Painting of Haeinsa Temple (The Vulture Peak Assembly) 합천 해인사 영산회상도 陜川 海印寺 靈山會上圖	Hapcheon County, South Gyeongsang	2024-12-26	
		Buddhist Painting in Daeungjeon Hall of Jikjisa Temple (Buddha Triad) 김천 직지사 석가여래삼불회도 金泉 直指寺 釋迦如來三佛會圖	Gimcheon, North Gyeongsang	2024-12-26	
		Five-story Stone Pagoda of Magoksa Temple, Gongju 공주 마곡사 오층석탑 公州 麻谷寺 五層石塔	Gongju, South Chungcheong	2025-01-09	
		Stupa of Master Jeokin at Taeansa Temple, Gokseong 곡성 태안사 적인선사탑 谷城 泰安寺 寂忍禪師塔	Gokseong County, South Jeolla	2025-03-11	
		Hanging Painting of Muryangsa Temple (Maitreya Buddha) 부여 무량사 미륵불 괘불도 扶餘 無量寺 彌勒佛 掛佛圖	Buyeo County, South Chungcheong	2025-04-24	
		Cheongjebi Monument, Yeongcheon 영천 청제비 永川 菁堤碑	Yeongcheon, North Gyeongsang	2025-06-20	
		Five-story Stone Pagoda at Gaesimsa Temple Site, Yecheon 예천 개심사지 오층석탑 醴泉 開心寺址 五層石塔	Yecheon. Gyeongsangbuk-do	2025-12-19	
		Five-story Stone Pagoda at Bowonsa Temple Site, Seosan 서산 보원사지 오층석탑 瑞山 普願寺址 五層石塔	Seosan, Chungcheongnam-do	2025-12-19	
		Bronze Bell of Bongseonsa Temple, Namyangju 남양주 봉선사 동종 南楊州 奉先寺 銅鍾	Namyangju, Gyeonggi-do	2026-04-23	

== See also ==
- Historic Sites (South Korea)
- National Treasure (North Korea)
- Culture of Korea
- History of Korea
