= Goguryeo Monument, Chungju =

5th century stele now in South Korea

Jungwon Goguryeo Stele
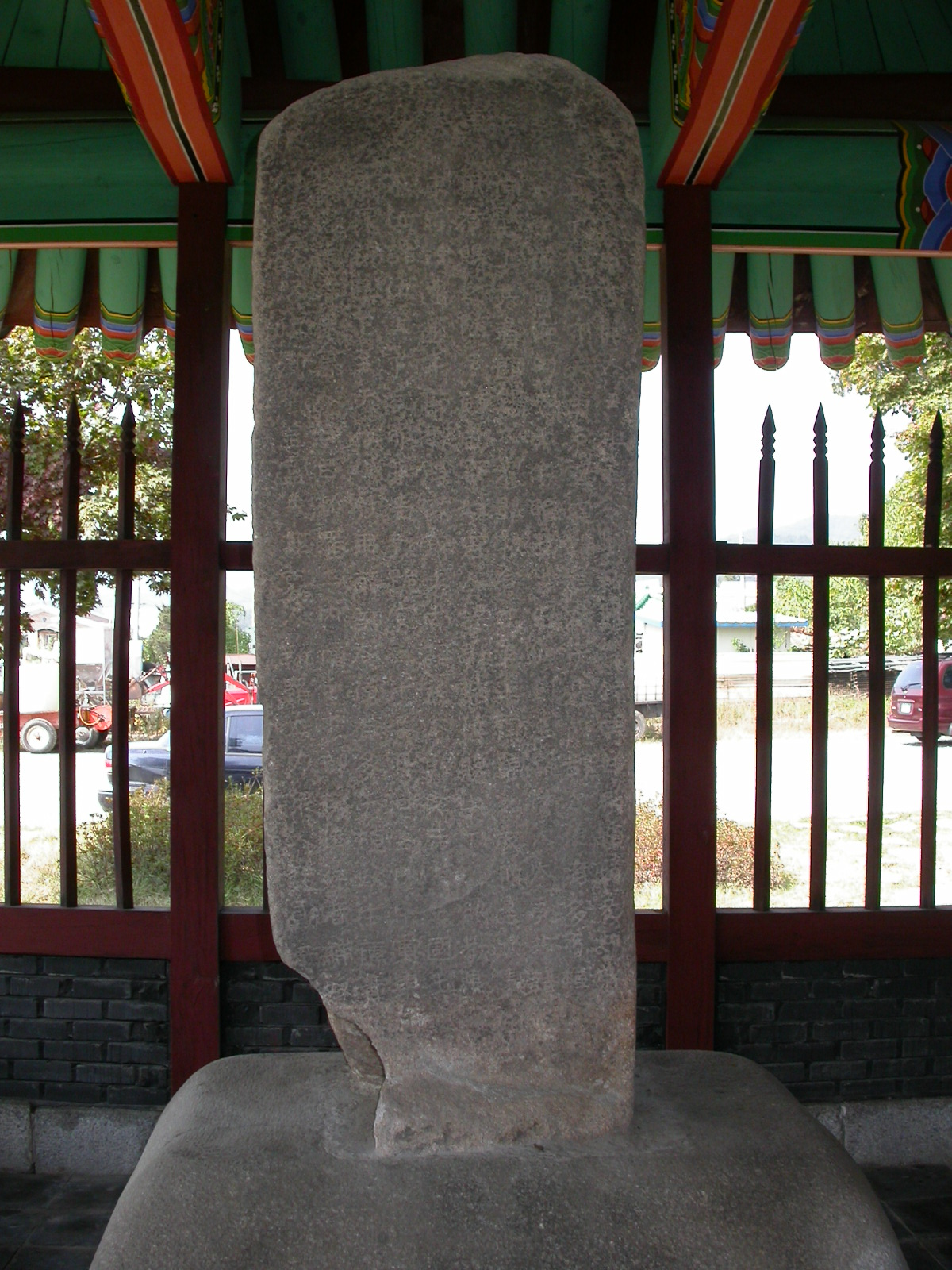
- Interactive map of Jungwon Goguryeo Stele
- Location: Chungju, South Korea
- Coordinates: 37.02823°N 127.84862°E
- Type: stele
- Material: stone
- Width: 55 cm (22 in)
- Height: 2.03 m (6 ft 8 in)
- Completion date: late 5th century

Korean name
- Hangul: 충주 고구려비
- Hanja: 忠州 高句麗碑
- RR: Chungju Goguryeobi
- MR: Ch'ungju Koguryŏbi

The Jungwon Goguryeo Monument is a stele in Chungju, North Chungcheong Province, South Korea, dating from the late 5th century. It is the only stele of the state of Goguryeo found on the Korean peninsula.

== Description ==
The stele was unearthed in the village of Ipseok, near Chungju, in 1979. It was originally inscribed on all four sides, but has been heavily eroded over the centuries, and now only part of the front and one side are legible. The stele celebrates the construction of a series of Goguryeo forts along the Namhan River after its conquest of central Korea under king Jangsu. It is rhetorically similar to the Gwanggaeto Stele, mentioning the hierarchy of Goguryeo officials, but refers to Silla as a "younger brother". It was designated as a National Treasure (no. 205) in 1981.

The inscription is written in literary Chinese, but contains some instances of subject–object–verb word order (as found in Korean and several other northeast Asian languages) instead of the subject–verb–object order found in Chinese.
