= Records of the Border Defense Council =

Korean books produced from 1617 to 1892

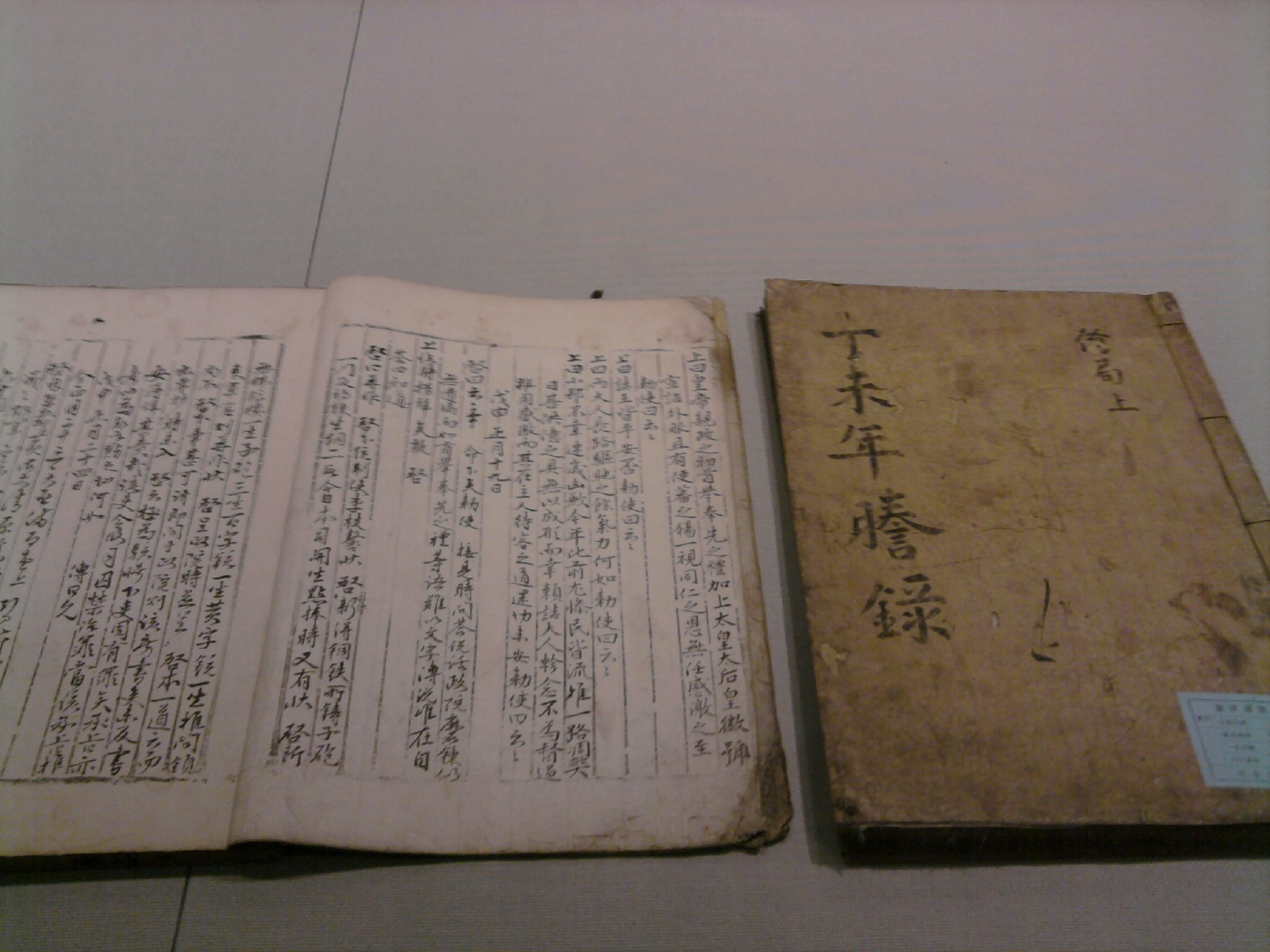
- Some volumes of the Records on display in 2013
- Created: 1617 to 1892
- Location: Kyujanggak Institute for Korean Studies, Seoul, South Korea
- Purpose: Government records of the Border Defense Council of Joseon

Korean name
- Hangul: 비변사등록
- Hanja: 備邊司謄錄
- Revised Romanization: Bibyeonsa Deungnok
- McCune–Reischauer: Pibyŏnsadŭngnok

The Records of the Border Defense Council of Joseon or Bibyeonsa Deungnok (Korean: 비변사등록) are the records of the Border Defense Council of Joseon. There are currently 273 extant books that were produced between 1617 and 1892. While the original intent was to produce one volume per year, in some years they produced multiple volumes; an uncertain number of volumes and pages are considered lost.

The records are considered a critical source for the study of Joseon history. On December 31, 1971 the Records were designated a National Treasure of South Korea.

== Background ==
The council was a temporary bureau established during the reign of King Jungjong in the 16th century that managed national security after the Japanese invasions of Korea. The powers of the Council were gradually expanded throughout the invasion, until it eventually became the most powerful body in the government.

== Description ==
There is disagreement as to when the records were first published. One theory is that the records were started when the council was established in 1555. Under this assumption, there should be 276 books.

The records consist of 273 extant volumes produced between 1617 and 1892. The title of each year's record is not always consistent, depending on incidents occurred in each year. Each annal firstly recorded the era of the King, the date and the member of the discussion in each month's council and then, the contents could be published. Therefore, the reader can find out what kinds of incidents happened and how the council legislated the aftermaths.

The records are considered a highly-valued and diverse description of the Joseon society and economy. They were originally published and held at the Kyujanggak. From 1959 to 60, the Korean History Committee re-published the full annals in 28 parts. Translations of the texts into modern hangul finished publication by 2010.

The council was abolished in 1865, the second year of the reign of Gojong of Joseon. Power was returned to the former supreme organ, the State Council of Joseon. However, the Records continued to be updated until 1892, albeit under the title Uijeongbu Deungnok (의정부등록; 議政府謄錄).

== See also ==
- Veritable Records of the Joseon Dynasty
- State Council of Joseon
- Joseon dynasty
- History of Korea
- National treasures of South Korea
