= Seven-story Brick Pagoda at Beopheungsa Temple Site, Andong =

Pagoda in Andong, South Korea

Coordinates: 36°33′58″N 128°44′47″E

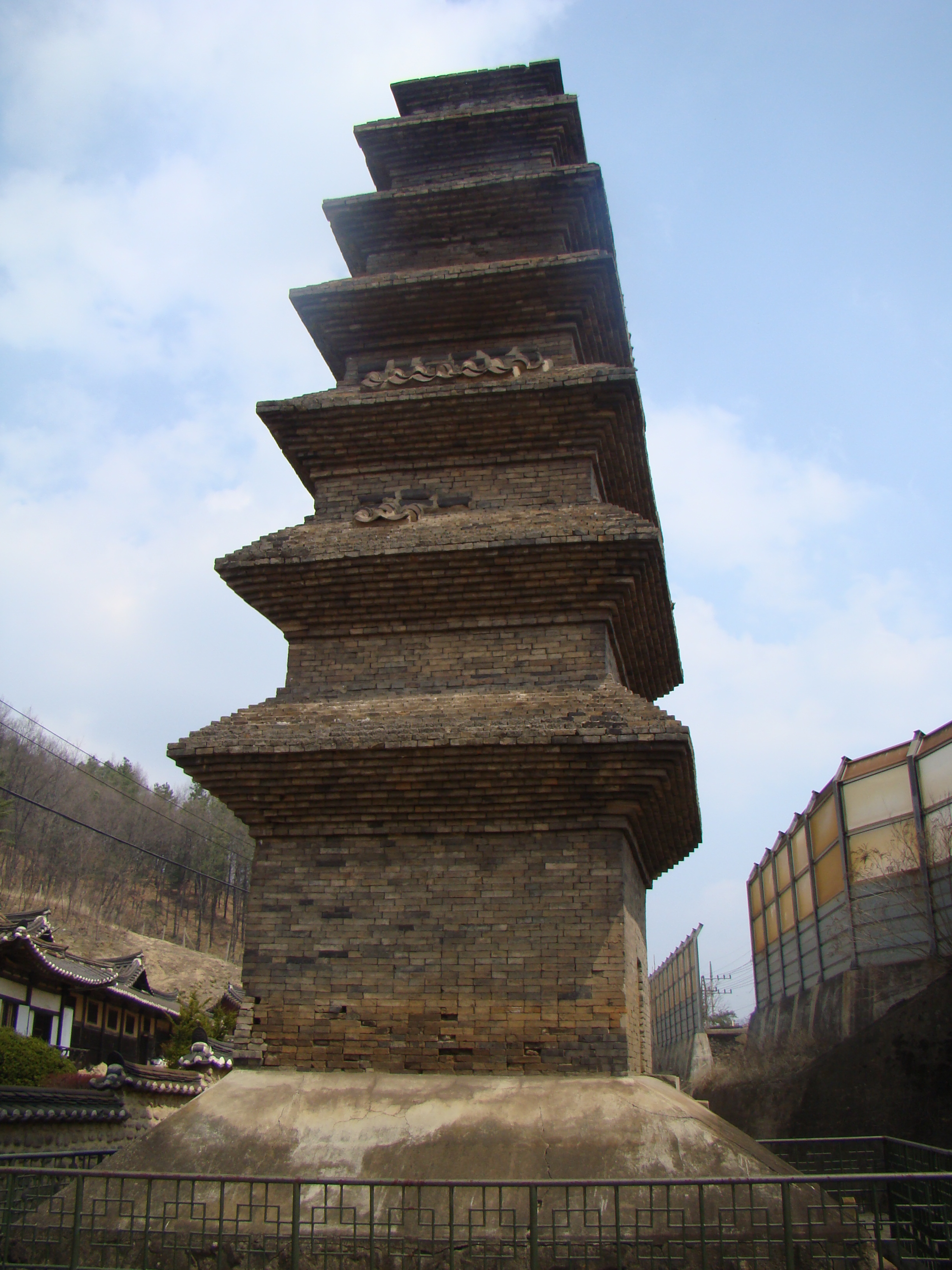

The Seven-story Brick Pagoda at Beopheungsa Temple Site, Andong (Korean: 안동 법흥사지 칠층전탑} is a brick pagoda located at the Beopheungsa Temple Site in Beopheung- dong, Andong- si, North Gyeongsang Province. It is believed to have been built during the Northern and Southern States period, but its exact date is unknown due to the sculptural elements of the pedestal and the mix of styles from various periods. It is considered a National Treasure of South Korea.

== History ==
This pagoda is believed to have belonged to Beopheungsa Temple, which was founded during the North-South States Period. It is of great value as one of the largest and oldest remaining stone pagodas in the country.

In 2025, it was announced that the pagoda is showing continued signs of structural tilt, prompting authorities to prepare a comprehensive conservation plan.

== Architecture and fittings ==
The brick pagoda is a tower built using clay bricks.

It consists of a seven-story tower body built solidly atop a single-tiered platform. On each side of the platform, granite statues of the Eight Guardian Deities and the Four Heavenly Kings are erected, and stairs are installed on the southern side of the platform, leading to a shrine (a room for enshrining a Buddhist statue) built into the body stone of the first floor. The tower body, built with dark gray plain bricks, has a shrine built into the body stone of the first floor. Unlike the typical brick pagoda style, which has stepped tiers both above and below, the roof stone appears to have been covered with tiles, judging from the traces remaining on the upper surface.

This tower has a regrettable appearance due to the upper surface of the pedestal being cemented under the pretext of repairs during the Japanese colonial period. The huge tower has seven floors, a height of 17m, and a pedestal width of 7.75m, but it maintains a very stable appearance.

== Location ==
The Jungang line railway passes directly in front of the tower, causing serious damage to the tower. The railway is currently being relocated to the outskirts of the city, which is expected to have a positive effect on the tower's preservation.

== Gallery ==
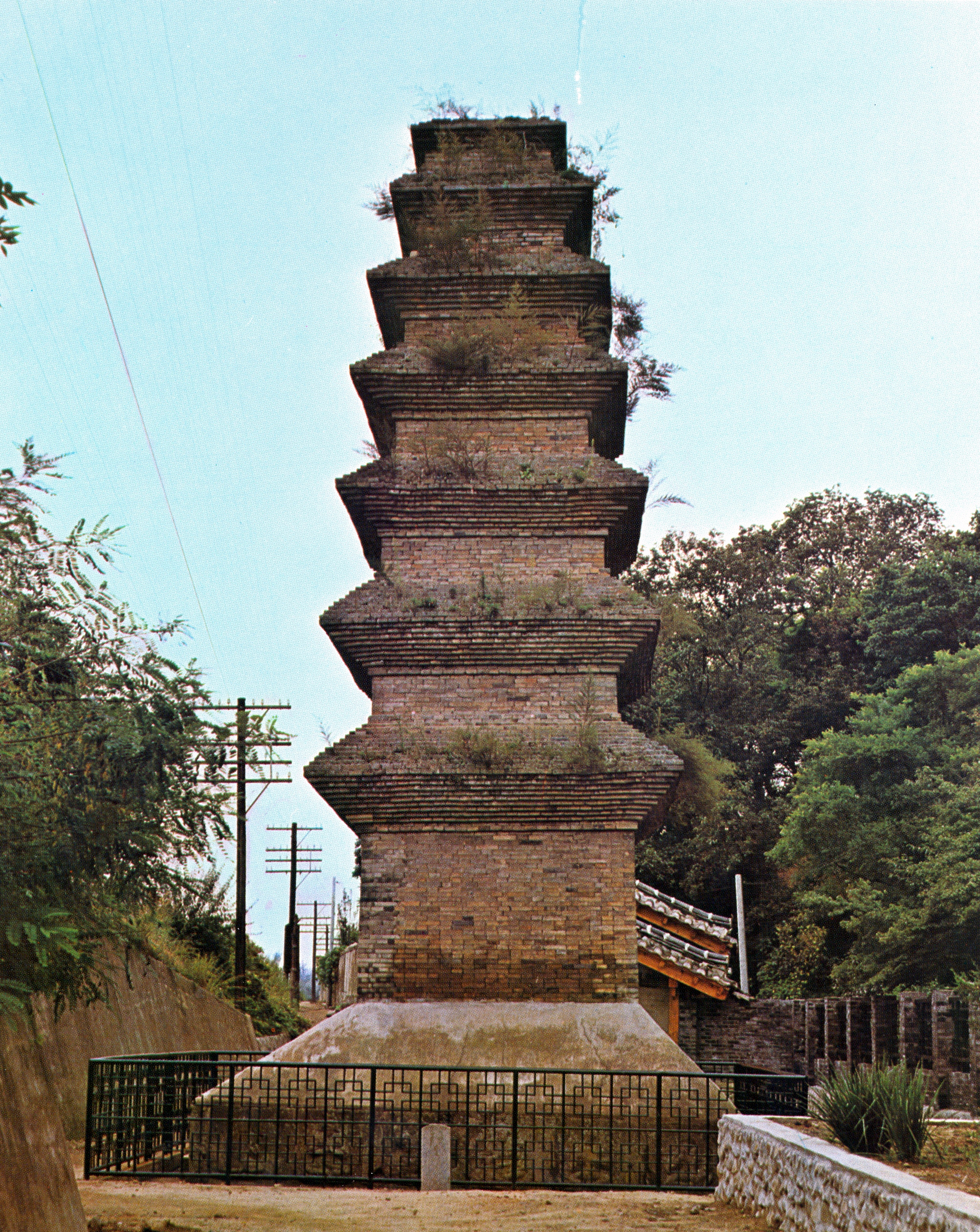

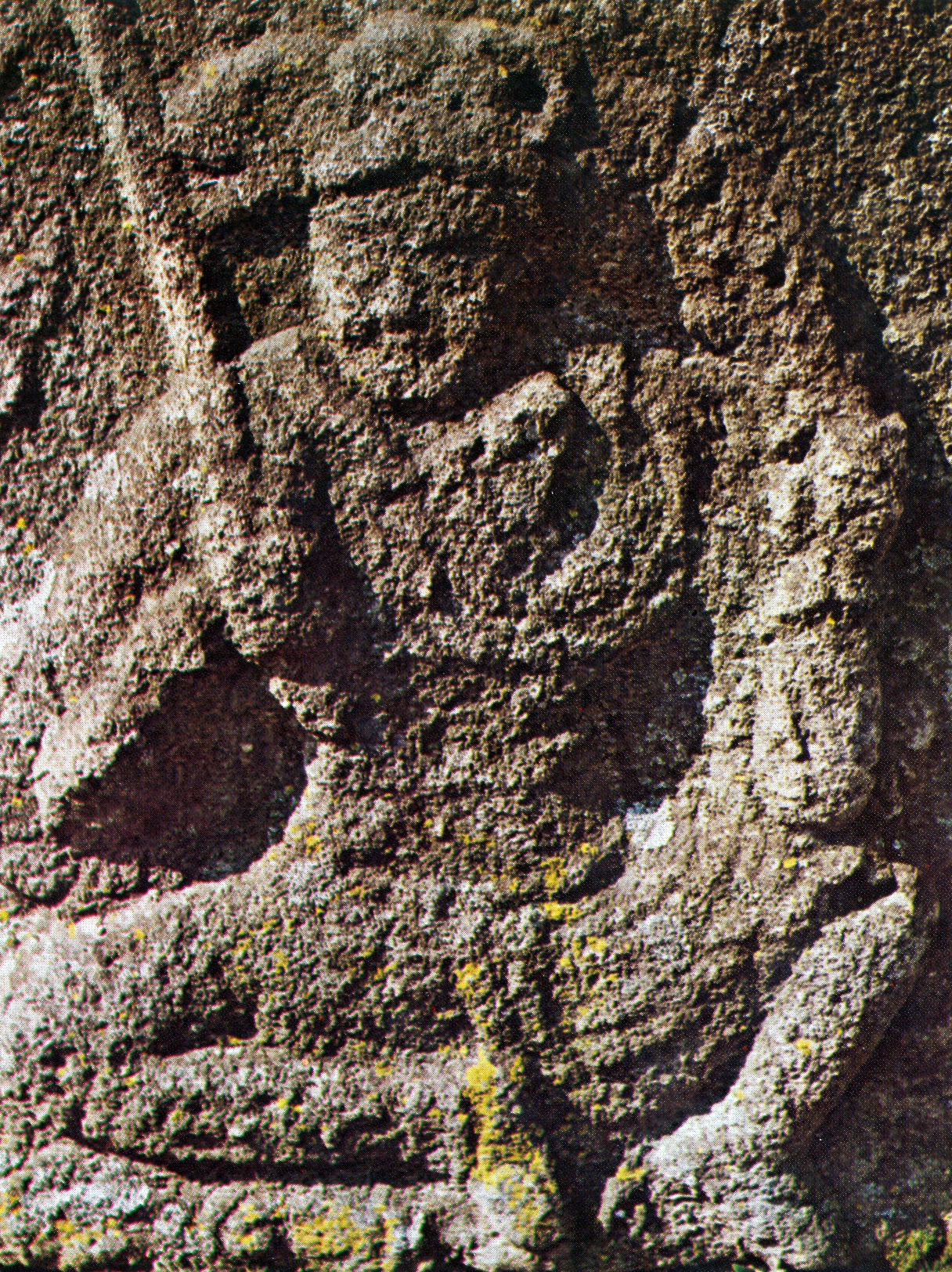

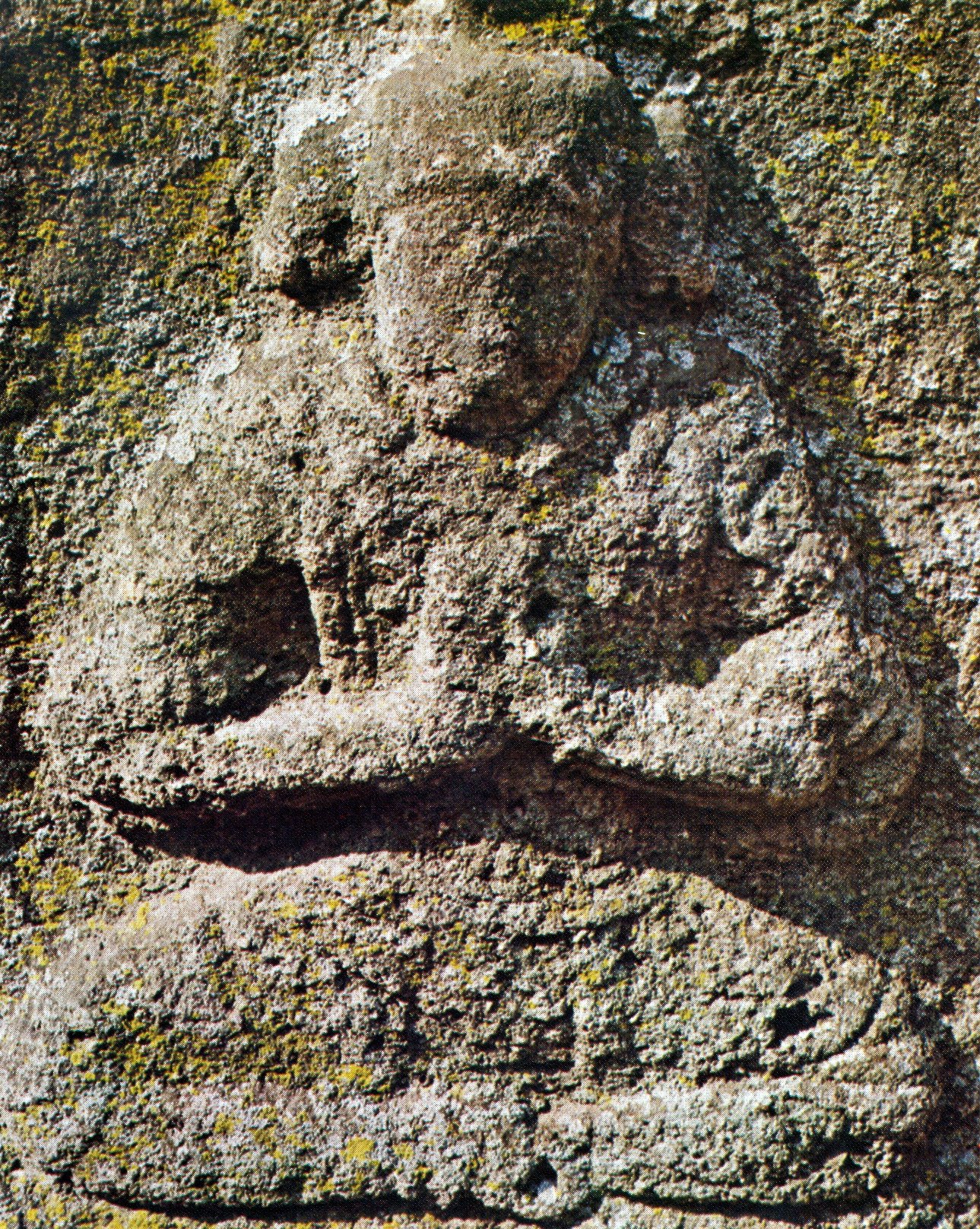
