= Seven-story Stone Pagoda in Tappyeong-ri, Chungju =

Later Silla-era pagoda in South Korea

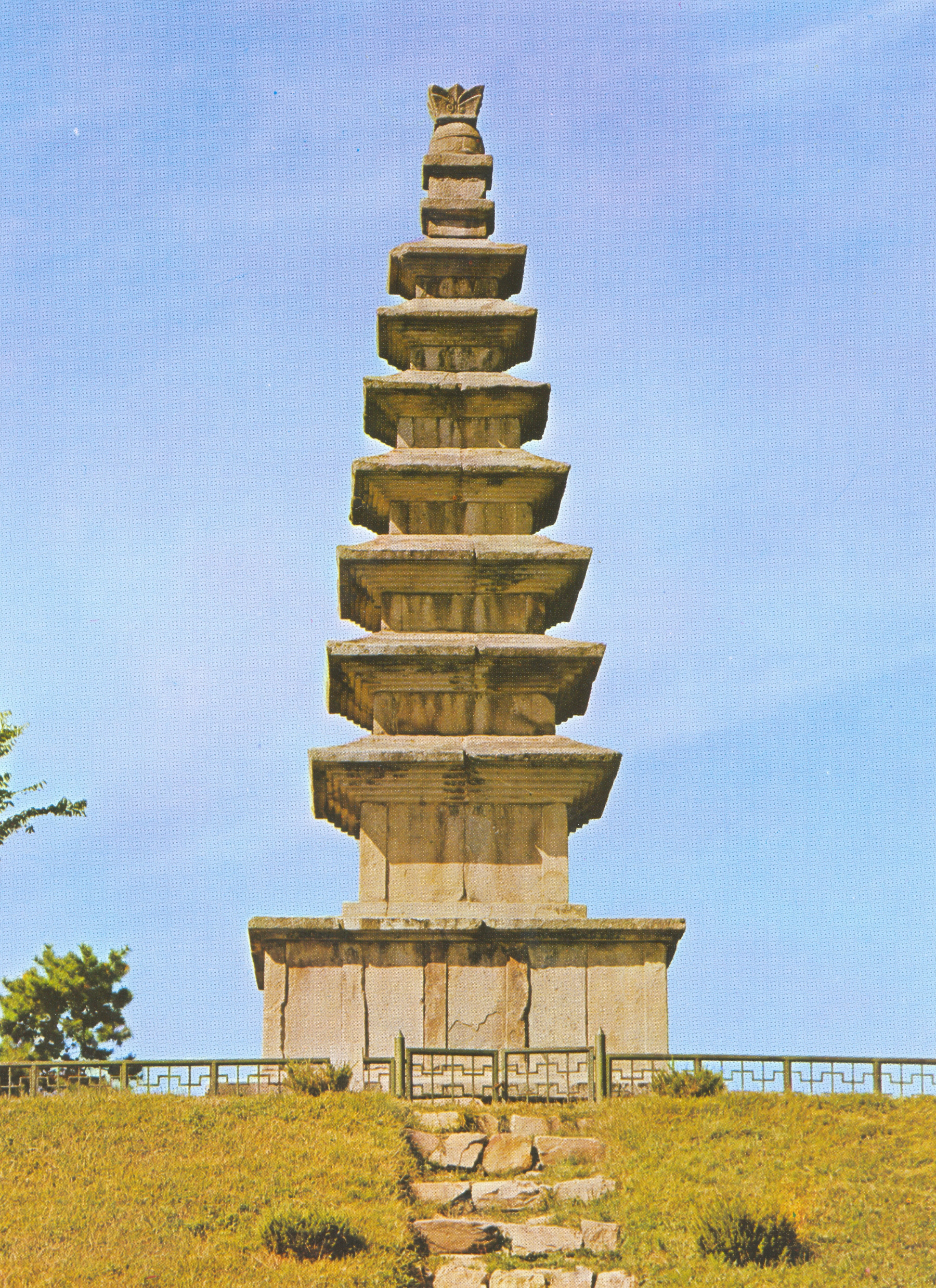
- The pagoda (2009)
- Completion date: 8th century
- Dimensions: 14.5 m (48 ft)
- Designation

National Treasure (South Korea)
- Designated: 1962-12-20
- Reference no.: 6
- Location: Chungju; 37°00′57″N 127°52′00″E

Korean name
- Hangul: 충주 탑평리 칠층석탑
- Hanja: 忠州 塔坪里 七層石塔
- RR: Chungju Tappyeong-ri chilcheung seoktap
- MR: Ch'ungju T'app'yŏng-ri ch'ilch'ŭng sŏkt'ap

Seven-story Stone Pagoda in Tappyeong-ri, Chungju (Korean: 충주 탑평리 칠층석탑), also called the Jungang Pagoda (Central Pagoda), is a 14.5-meter-tall (48 ft) stone pagoda near the Namhan River in North Chungcheong Province, South Korea. It is the tallest stone pagoda of the Later Silla period.

== History ==
The stone pagoda is estimated to have been built during the reign of King Wonseong in the 8th century, and it has a style which was typical of the Later Silla period. It is presumed that the pagoda was once part of a temple site; various artifacts were discovered beneath the pagoda in 1917, including religious items and a mirror from the Goryeo period.

According to a legend, the pagoda was at the center of the country. Thus, if two people from the northern and southern ends of the country walked at the same pace toward each other, they would end up meeting at the pagoda.
