= Washing the Elephant =

Subject in Chinese Buddhist painting

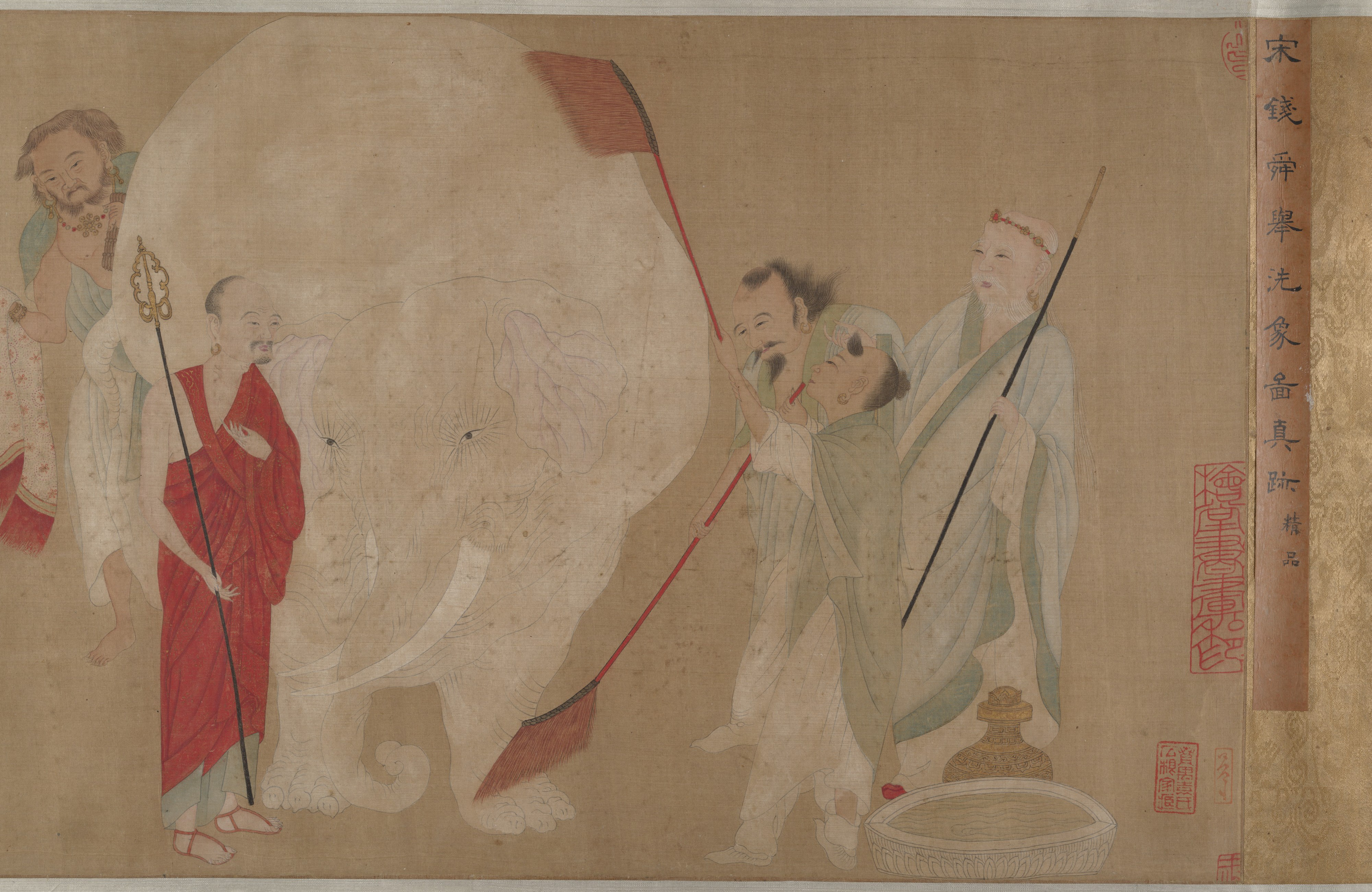
16–17th century copy of Qian Xuan (d. 1301). The arhat is in red, Manjushri at right.

Washing the Elephant (Chinese: 扫象图; pinyin: saoxiang, literally sweeping the elephant; English variants: "sweeping", and "white" or "sacred" elephant) is a subject in Chinese Buddhist painting, showing a group of men washing a white elephant with brushes, under the supervision of the bodhisattva Manjushri and an arhat with a khakkhara (xīzhàng) staff. Manjushri is usually depicted in the costume of a meditation master in Chinese Buddhist monasteries, rather than his usual appearance in iconic paintings.

The Buddhist meaning of the subject relates to "sweeping away illusion", in a pun as the Chinese words for "elephant" (象) and "illusion/form/image" (相) are both pronounced as xiang. One painting is inscribed with the explanation “wash off the dust and see the Buddha of thusness”.

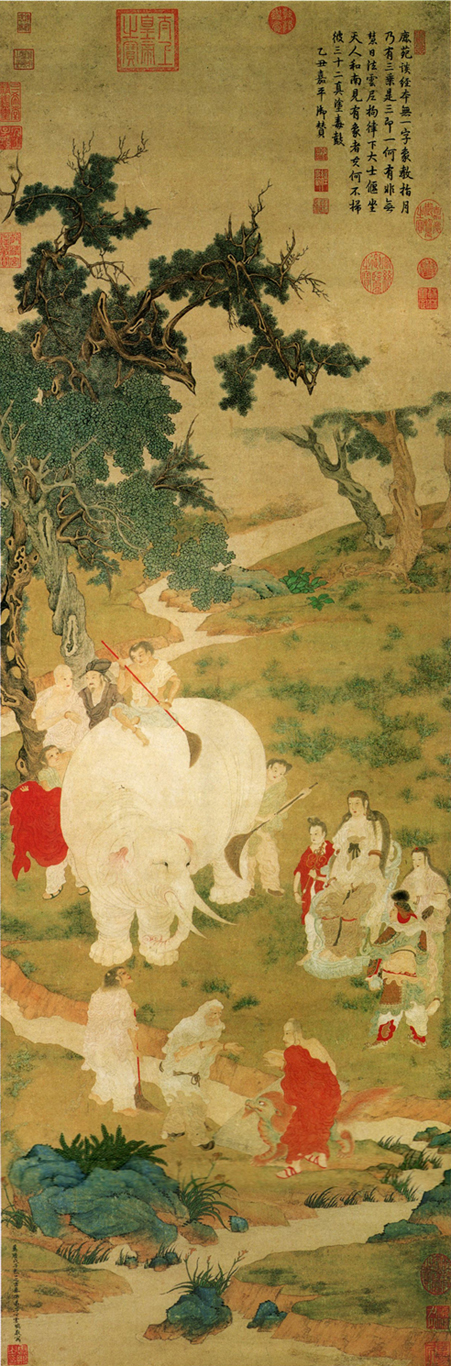
Ding Yunpeng, c. 1588. Manjushri enthroned, with arhat to his left.

The white elephant, widely regarded as sacred in Buddhism, may be shown as having six tusks, a form that Buddha himself took in an earlier life recounted in the Jataka tales, and also during the dream of Queen Maya, when according to Buddhist tradition, he was conceived for his last earthly life.

== History ==
The subject is restricted to China, and was most popular during the 16th century. Ding Yunpeng, a devout Buddhist, painted the subject several times, and it became popular painted on Chinese porcelain in the Late Ming and early Qing. A vase fetched USD 137,000 in a Christie's auction in 2015.

The earliest record of the subject in art dates from the 6th century. Tang dynasty paintings of the same theme have a traditional colour scheme of red and white with some green. A Ming dynasty painting of the same scene by Chen Hongshou in the collection of the Metropolitan Museum of Art has an inscription suggesting that Ming intellectuals considered this scene to represent "sweeping away illusion".

There is little literary evidence for the origins of the elephant tale, but researchers speculate a connection with one of the stories of the Nirvana Sutra. The story is of the blind men who feel an elephant (Chinese: 盲人摸象; Jyutping: mang2ren2mo1xiang4)—the elephant in this tale symbolizes the "Buddha nature". A group of blind men reach out to touch a different part of the elephant—one feels the tusk and thinks it is a carrot, another mistakes the elephant's belly for an urn, and so on. The king seeks that Shakyamuni (Buddha) illuminate their limited perception (symbolized by blindness in the parable) that permits only partial truths.

== The emperor views a scroll ==
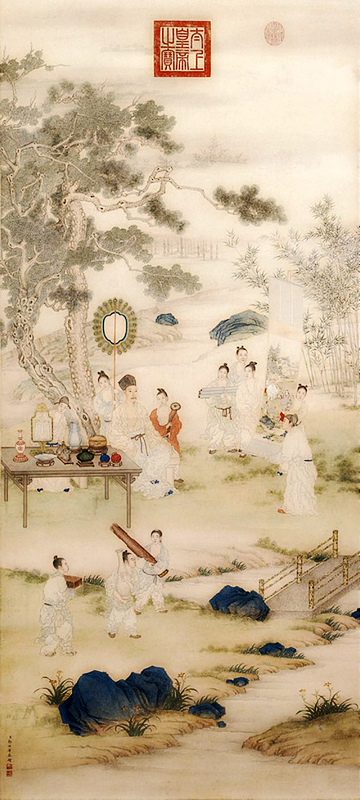
The Qianlong Emperor Viewing Paintings, Giuseppe Castiglione, c. 1746–50

In a painting of c. 1746–50 by the Jesuit missionary and court painter Giuseppe Castiglione of the Qianlong Emperor viewing works from his huge art collection, the work being viewed is a scroll of the subject by Ding Yunpeng. The landscape in which the emperor sits echoes that in the painting. Around the same time, Qianlong commissioned a painting of the subject from one of his Chinese court painters, Ding Guanpeng, in which the figure of Manjushri was a portrait of the emperor. This is now in the National Palace Museum in Taiwan, while the painting of Qianlong is in the Palace Museum, Beijing.

A different version by Ding Yunpeng was sold in China in 2018 for RMB 10 million, then equating to USD 1,572,327.

== Li Gonglin ==
There is a Yuan or Song dynasty ink on silk hanging scroll attributed to Li Gonglin. The painting depicts 8 foreign grooms, 2 foreign observers, four monks, and two Chinese attired in loose robes. The heavy labor is left to foreign grooms. It is in the collection of the Indiana University Art Museum.

The silk painting attributed to Li Gonglin was at one time in the collection of Xiang Yuanbian (1525-1590), and this and other works were scattered as a result of subsequent military invasions, with some passing into the hands of other collectors.
