= Manjushri =

Bodhisattva in Mahāyāna Buddhism

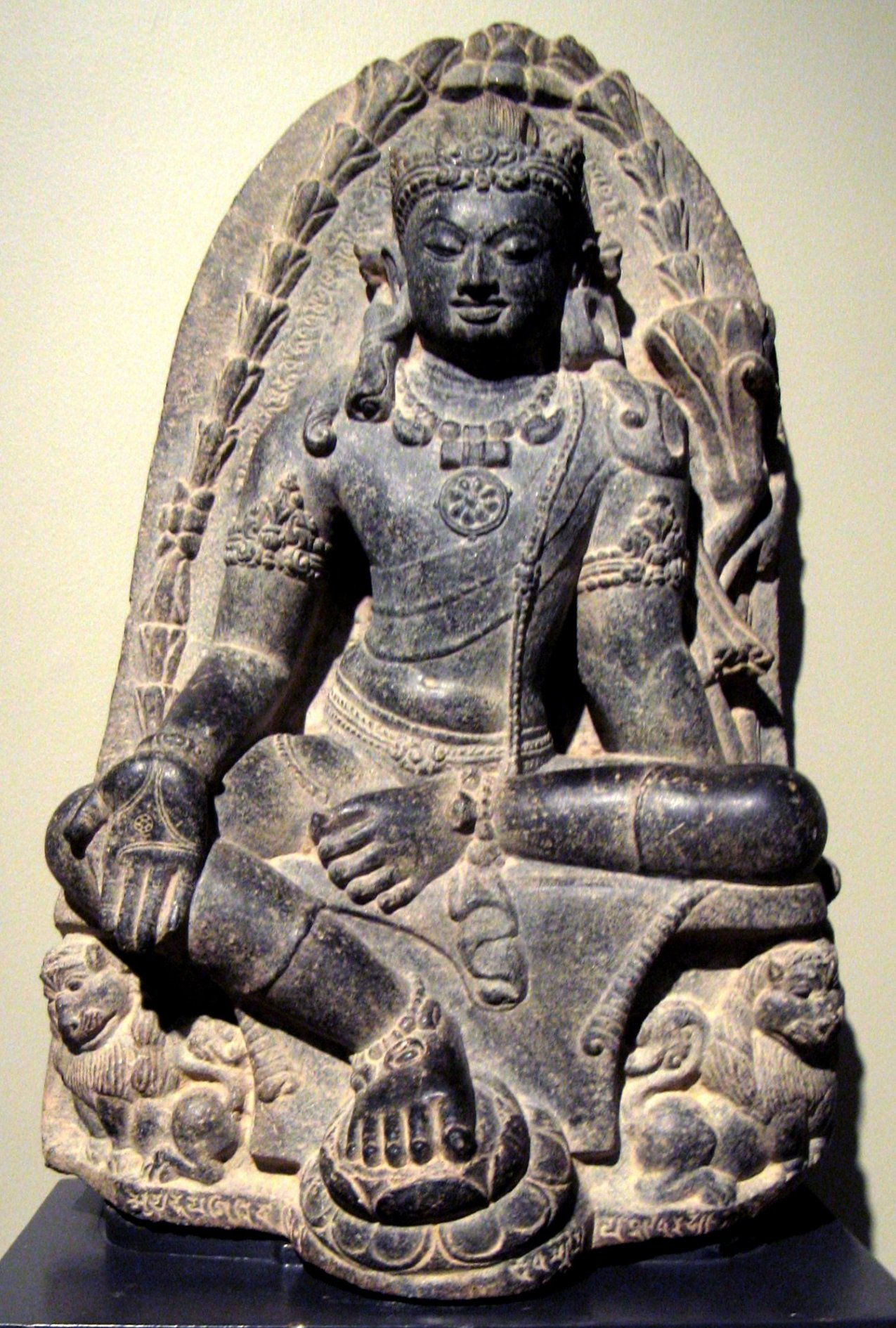
- Mañjuśrī, Pala Dynasty, Eastern India, 9th century CE
- Sanskrit: 𑀫𑀜𑁆𑀚𑀼𑀰𑁆𑀭𑀻 Mañjuśrī
- Bikol: Mangushli
- Burmese: မဥ္ဇူသီရိ
- Cebuano: Mangushli
- Chinese: 文殊菩薩; Jyutping: Man4 syu4 pou4 saat3 Pinyin: Wénshū Púsà 文殊師利菩薩; Jyutping: Man4 syu4 si1 lei6 pou4 saat3 Pinyin: Wénshūshīlì Púsà 曼殊室利菩薩; Jyutping: Maan6 syu4 sat1 lei6 pou4 saat3 Pinyin: Mànshūshìlì Púsà 妙吉祥菩薩; Jyutping: Miu6 gat1 coeng4 pou4 saat3 Pinyin: Miàojíxiáng Púsà 妙德菩薩; Jyutping: Miu6 dak1 pou4 saat3 Pinyin Miàodé Púsà 妙音菩薩; Pinyin: Miu6 jam1 pou4 saat3 Pinyin: Miàoyīn Púsà
- Japanese: 文殊菩薩(もんじゅぼさつ) (romaji: Monju Bosatsu) 文殊師利菩薩(もんじゅしりぼさつ) (romaji: Monjushiri Bosatsu) 妙吉祥菩薩(みょうきっしょうぼさつ) (romaji: Myōkisshō Bosatsu)
- Khmer: មញ្ចុស្រី (manh-cho-srei)
- Korean: 문수보살 (RR: Munsu Bosal) 만수보살 (RR: Mansu Bosal) 묘길상보살 (RR: Myokilsang Bosal)
- Mongolian: ᠮᠠᠩᠵᠣᠰᠢᠷᠢ᠂ ᠵᠦᠭᠡᠯᠡᠨ ᠡᠭᠰᠢᠭᠲᠦ; Манзушир, Манзшир, Зөөлөн эгшигт SASM/GNC: Mangjusiri, Zögelen egsigtü
- Tagalog: Mangushli
- Thai: พระมัญชุศรีโพธิสัตว์ (RTGS: phra manchusi phothisat) พระมัญชุศรี (RTGS: phra manchusi)
- Tibetan: འཇམ་དཔལ་དབྱངས་ Wylie: 'jam dpel dbyang THL: Jampelyang འཇམ་དཔལ་ Wylie: 'jam dpel THL: jampel
- Vietnamese: Văn Thù Sư Lợi Bồ Tát; Văn-thù; Diệu Đức; Diệu Cát Tường; Diệu Âm

Information
- Venerated by: Mahayana, Vajrayana

Manjushri (Sanskrit: 𑀫𑀜𑁆𑀚𑀼𑀰𑁆𑀭𑀻, romanized: Mañjuśrī) is a bodhisattva who represents prajñā (transcendent wisdom) of the Buddhas in Mahāyāna Buddhism. The name "Mañjuśrī" is a combination of Sanskrit word "mañju" and an honorific "śrī"; it can be literally translated as "Beautiful One with Glory" or "Beautiful One with Auspiciousness". Mañjuśrī is also known by the fuller name of Mañjuśrīkumārabhūta (मञ्जुश्रीकुमारभूत), literally "Mañjuśrī, Still a Youth" or, less literally, "Prince Mañjuśrī". Another name of Mañjuśrī is Mañjughōṣa.

== In Mahāyāna Buddhism ==
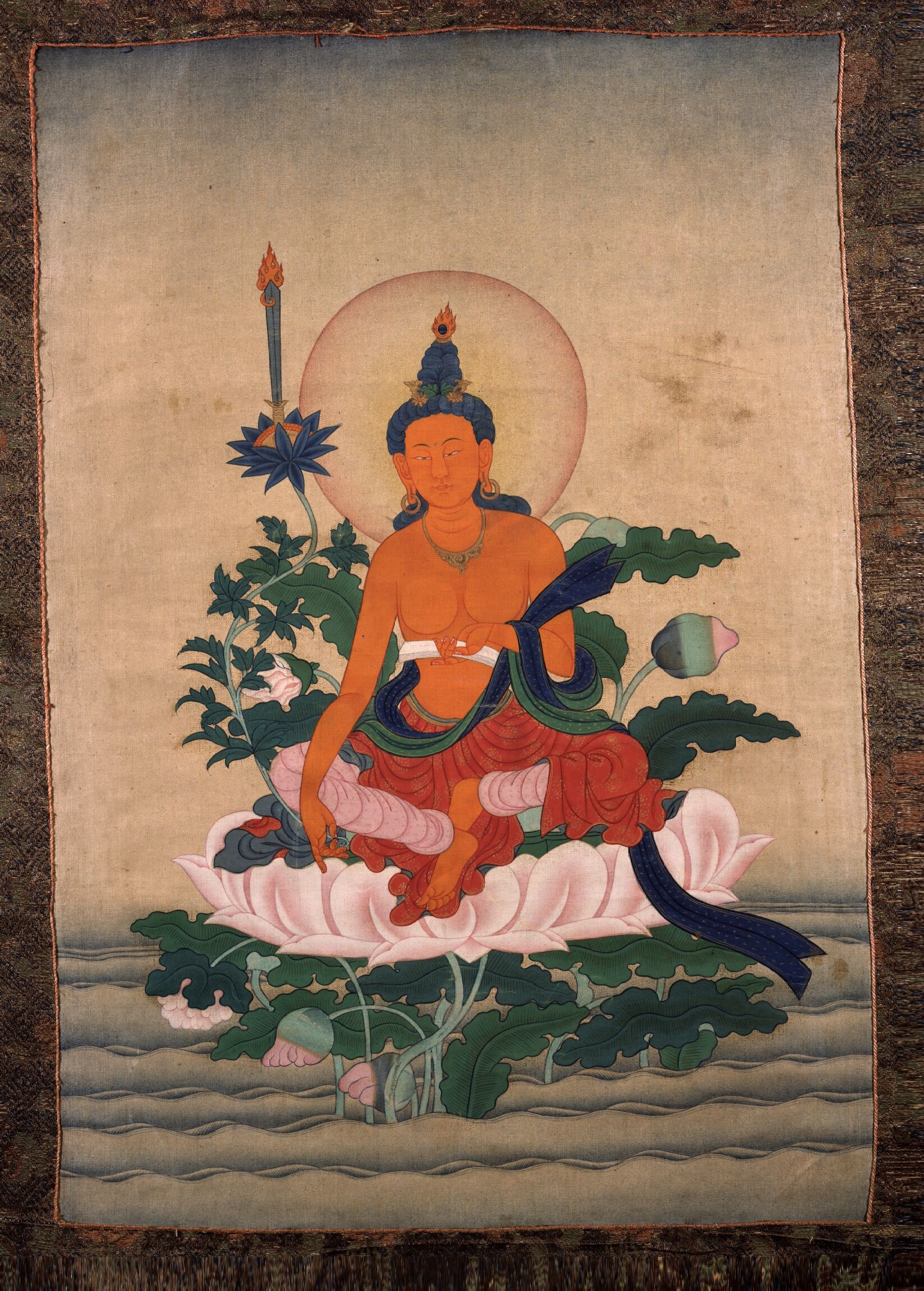
Tibetan Painting of Mañjuśrī with the sword of wisdom and a Prajñāpāramitā Sūtra, which are common symbols of Prajñāpāramitā in Buddhist art.

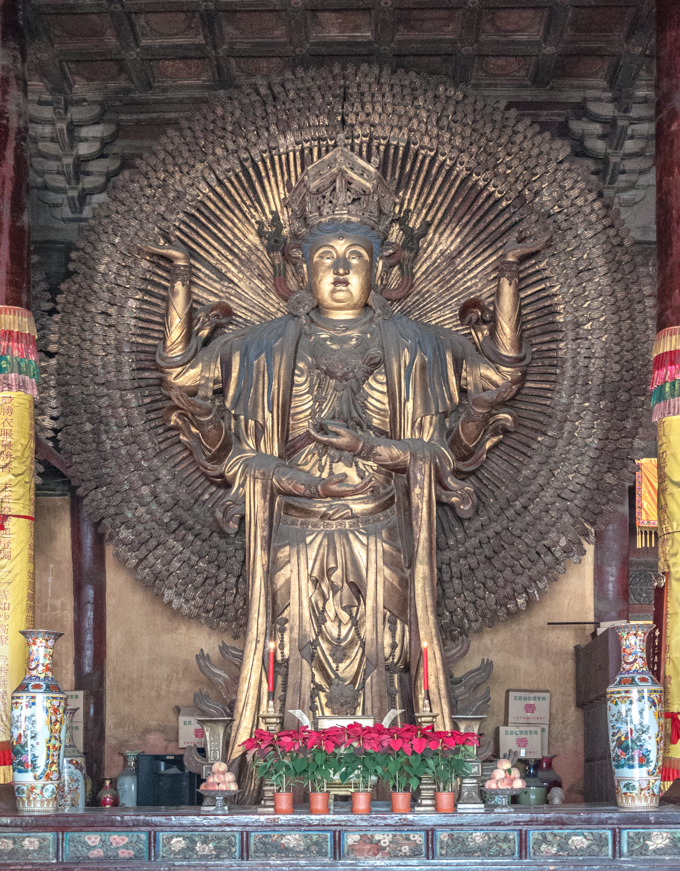
Ming dynasty (1368 - 1644) statue of Thousand Arms Thousand Bowls and Thousand Sakyamunis Mañjuśrī in Chongshan Temple, Shanxi, China. According to Vajrayana Sutras, this manifestation of Mañjuśrī has thousands of hands, each holding a bowl, from which a Sakyamuni Buddha manifests and then multiplies, becoming trillions of Sakyamuni Buddhas. This manifestation symbolizes that the countless Sakyamuni Buddhas, who teach Dharma in countless worlds, give their teachings based on Mañjuśrī the Great Wisdom, namely Prajñāpāramitā.

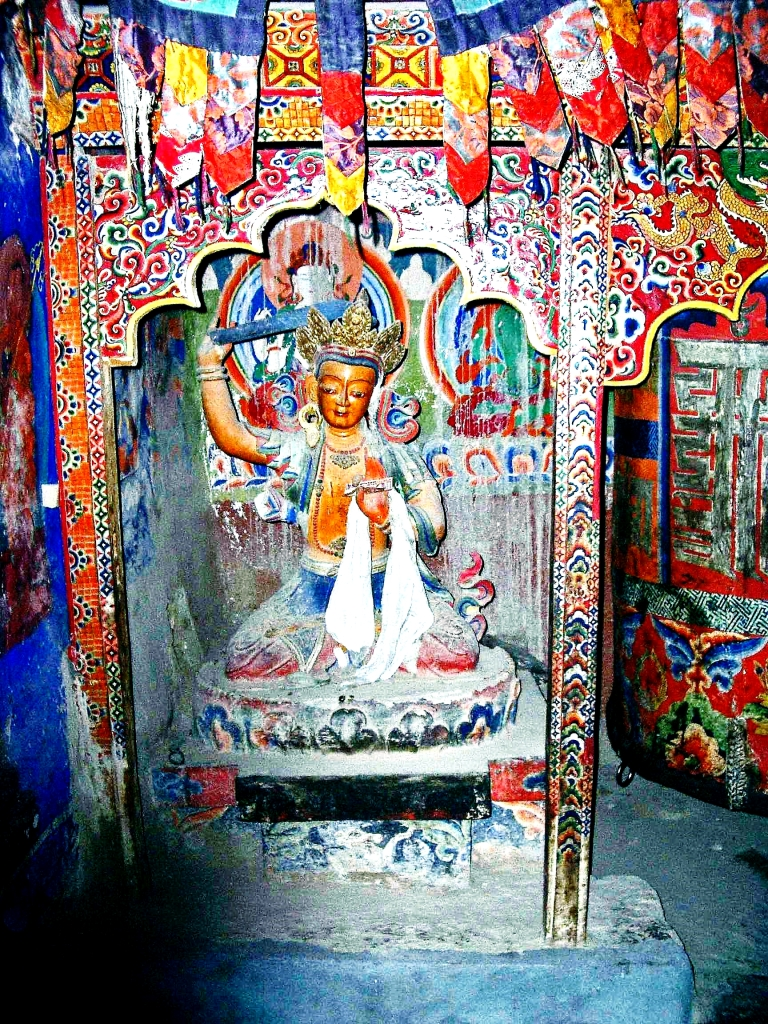
Manjushri statue, Lhalung Gompa, Spiti Valley, India.

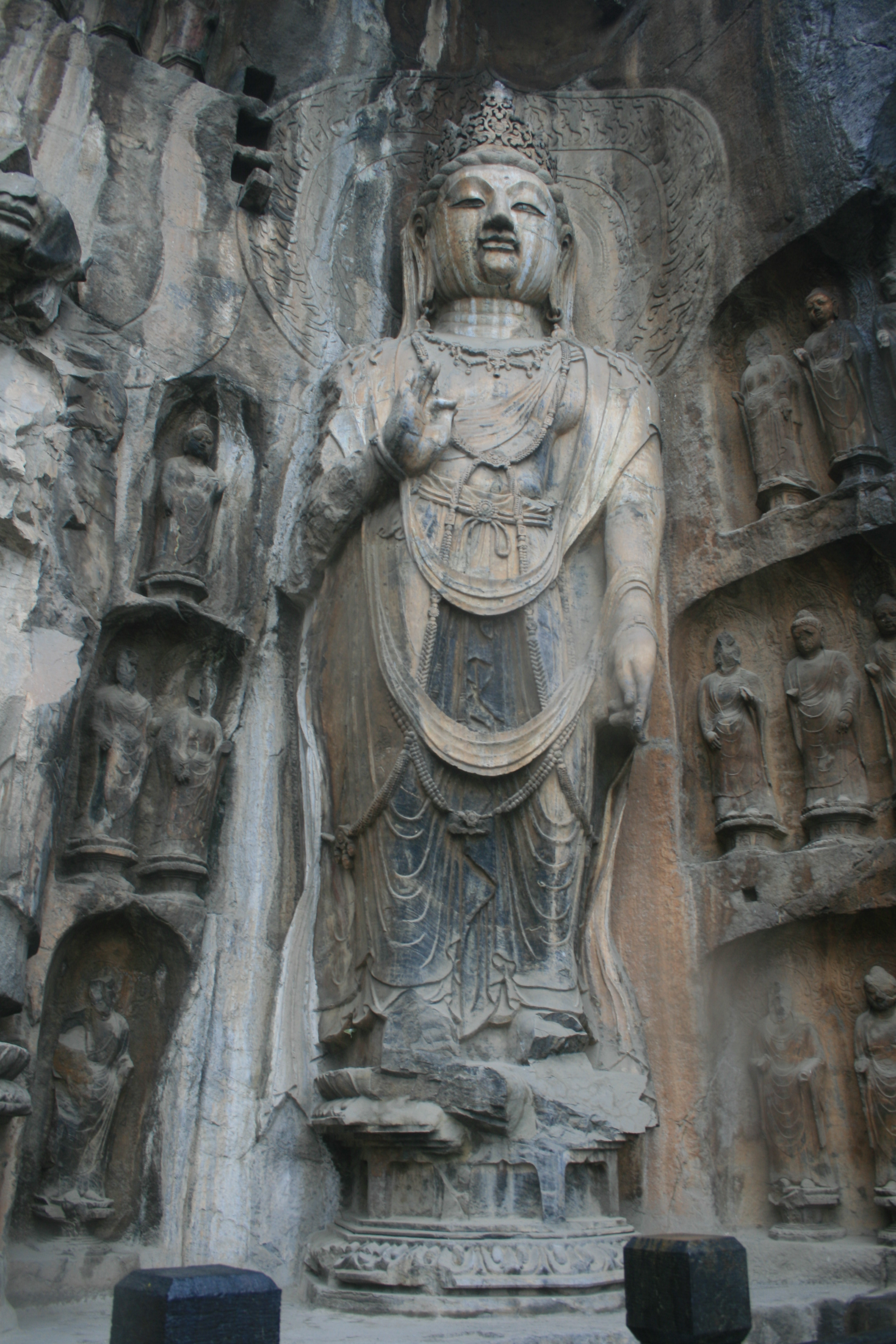
Tang dynasty (618-907) colossal statue of Mañjuśrī (Wenshu) at the Longmen Grottoes in Henan, China.

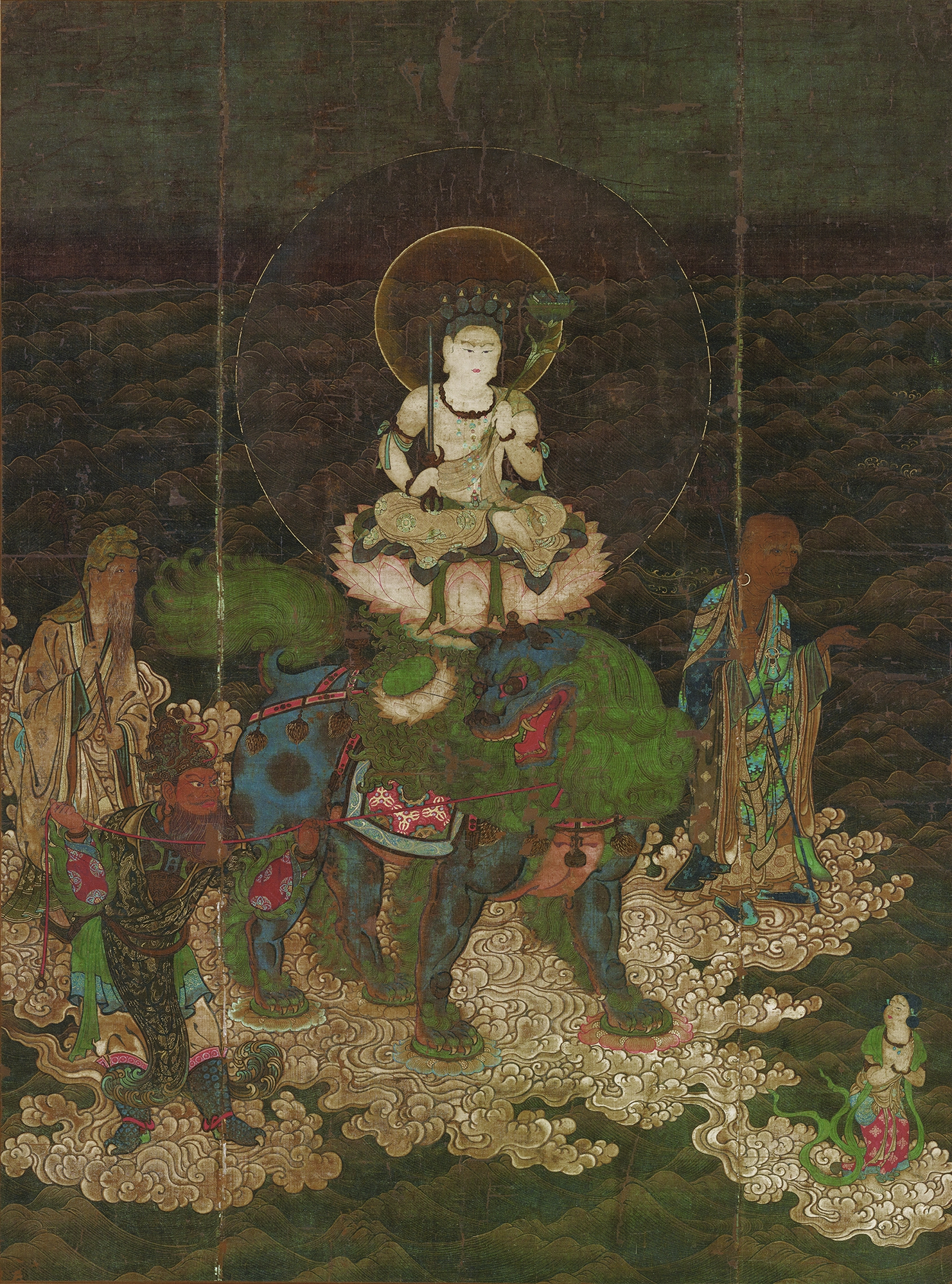
Kamakura period (1185–1333) painting of Lion-riding Mañjuśrī (Monju) crossing the sea. 13th century, Japan.

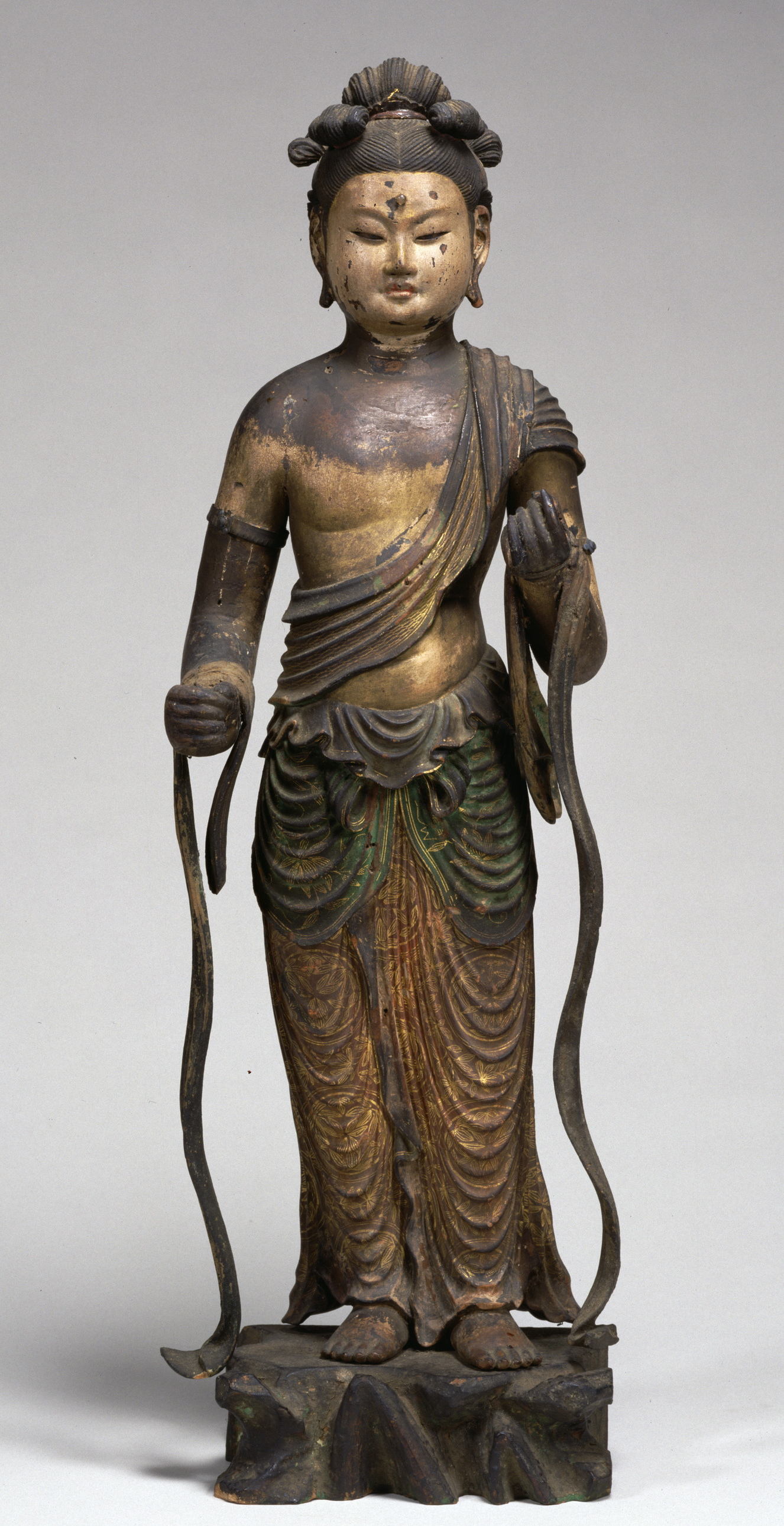
Youth Mañjuśrī (Monju), Kamakura period, Tokyo National Museum, Japan.

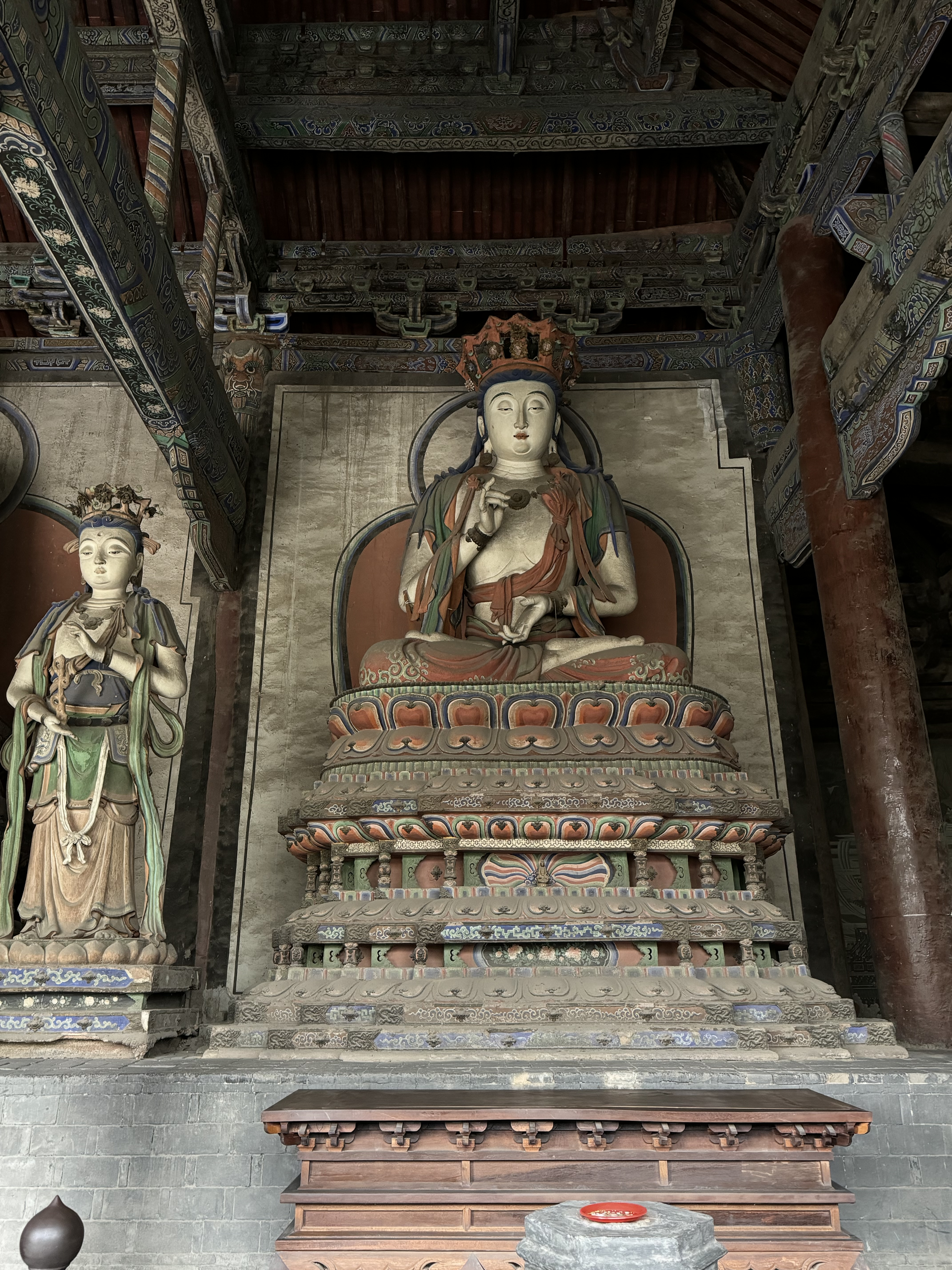
Jin dynasty (1115-1234) statue of Mañjuśrī (Wenshu) with an attendant as part of a set depicting the Three Noble Ones of Huayan: Vairocana, Samantabhadra and Mañjuśrī, at Shanhua Temple in Shanxi, China.

Qing dynasty (1644-1912) painting of Mañjuśrī (Wenshu) by Ding Guanpeng. 18th century, China.

Scholars have identified Mañjuśrī as the oldest and most significant bodhisattva in Mahāyāna literature. Notable traits of Mañjuśrī include:

=== Buddha appearing as Bodhisattva ===
According to some Mahayana Sutras, Mañjuśrī is always a Buddha with the highest Awakenment at all times, including in the past, present, and future, but appears as a Bodhisattva in our world.

In Śūraṅgama Samādhi Sūtra, the Buddha revealed that countless eons ago, Mañjuśrī had achieved Buddhahood with the name Dragon Superior Tathāgata.

In Tathagata's Unimaginable State Sutra, it is written that when Sakyamuni Buddha attained the highest Awakenment, countless Buddhas from other worlds, appearing as Bodhisattvas, came to our world to congratulate him and assist his Dharma-teaching work, and Mañjuśrī was one of those Buddhas who appeared as Bodhisattvas.

Another Sutra, Bodhisattva in the Womb Sutra reveals that Mañjuśrī is actually a Buddha, but in order to assist Sakyamuni Buddha's Dharma-teaching work, he appears as a disciple of the Buddha. In the Sutra Mañjuśrī says:

My bodies are as many as the atoms of the universe, appearing as Buddhas in countless Buddha-Worlds elsewhere.
I was previously the teacher of Sakyamuni Buddha, and now I appear as his disciple.
I would like to manifest my Buddha body, but this world should have only one main Buddha at this moment.
Therefore I appear as a disciple in this world, and appear as Buddhas in other Buddha-Worlds.

In Aṅgulimālīya Sūtra it is written that Mañjuśrī is a present Buddha whose Buddha-world is in the north:

To the north, passing worlds as numerous as the sands of forty-two Ganges Rivers, there is a world called Constant Joy, where the Buddha is called Joy Store Mani Jewel Accumulation Tathāgata, Arhat, Samyak-Saṁbuddha ...... Is that Tathāgata anyone else? Mañjuśrī is actually that Buddha.

Mañjuśrī will also become a Buddha in this world in physical form. According to Mahāratnakūṭa Sūtra, when Mañjuśrī becomes here a Buddha (again) in the future, he will be called Universally Seen, and his Buddha-World will be extremely vast and sublime.

=== Mother of all Buddhas ===
According to Mahayana Sutras, Mañjuśrī is the one who guides all living beings of the past, present and future towards Buddhahood, therefore he is honored as the Mother of all Buddhas of the past, present and future (三世佛母妙吉祥).

As it is written in Mahayana Sutra on Contemplating the Ground-Like Heart Concerning the Legend of the Buddha (大乘本生心地觀經):

Manjusri the Great Holy Lord
is the Mother of all Buddhas of the past, present and future.
All Buddhas of the ten directions,
when they first arouse their hearts to seek Bodhi,
they do so because of Manjusri's teaching and guidance.

Mahayana Sutra on Contemplating the Ground-Like Heart Concerning the Legend of the Buddha also says:

The Buddha said to Manjusri: "You are indeed the Mother of all Buddhas of the past, present and future. All Tathagatas, when they first arouse their hearts, or carry out their practice for Bodhi, they do those things because of your guidance. "

Placing the Bowl Sutra says:

The Buddha said: "... I achieved Buddhahood all because of Manjusri's benevolence. Furthermore, all the countless Buddhas in the past were disciples of Manjusri, and all those who will become Buddhas in the future, they will achieve Buddhahood because of Manjusri's mightiness, benevolence, and divine power."

In the Lotus Sūtra, Mañjuśrī also leads the Nagaraja's daughter to enlightenment. He also figures in the Vimalakīrti Sūtra in a debate with Vimalakīrti where he is presented as a Bodhisattva who discusses non-duality with him.

Mañjuśrī puts effective ways into practice to guide beings towards enlightenment. His bodhisattvas have legendary magical power which they use to deepen recognition and dharmic knowledge, render certainty, avert hindrances, remove harmful and ensure important conditions for practising and spreading the teaches.

=== Eternal Youth ===
Although Mañjuśrī, in the previous innumerable eons, had helped countless living beings achieve Buddhahood, the great mentor himself remains a youth forever. In Mahayana Sutras, Mañjuśrī is frequently called Manjusri the Youth (Manjusri Kumara-bhuta).

=== Symbolizing Prajñā the Transcendental Wisdom ===
As a symbol of Prajñāpāramitā, Mañjuśrī is often depicted as a youth holding the Sword of Wisdom in one hand, and a Prajñāpāramitā Sūtra in another hand. In Mahayana Buddhism he is often honored as Mañjuśrī the Great Wisdom (大智文殊師利).

An example of a wisdom teaching of Mañjuśrī can be found in the Saptaśatikā Prajñāpāramitā Sūtra (Taishō Tripiṭaka 232). This sūtra contains a dialogue between Mañjuśrī and the Buddha on the One Samādhi (Skt. Ekavyūha Samādhi). Sheng-yen renders the following teaching of Mañjuśrī, for entering samādhi naturally through transcendent wisdom:

Contemplate the five skandhas as originally empty and quiescent, non-arising, non-perishing, equal, without differentiation. Constantly thus practicing, day or night, whether sitting, walking, standing or lying down, finally one reaches an inconceivable state without any obstruction or form. This is the Samadhi of One Act (一行三昧; Yīxíng sānmèi).

== Vajrayāna Buddhism ==
Within Vajrayāna Buddhism, Mañjuśrī is a meditational deity and also considered a fully enlightened Buddha. In Shingon Buddhism, he is one of the Thirteen Buddhas to whom disciples devote themselves. He figures extensively in many esoteric texts such as the Mañjuśrīmūlakalpa and the Mañjuśrīnāmasamgīti. His consort in some traditions is Saraswati.

The Mañjuśrīmūlakalpa, which later came to be classified under Kriyātantra, states that mantras taught in the Śaiva, Garuḍa, and Vaiṣṇava tantras will be effective if applied by Buddhists since they were all taught originally by Mañjuśrī.

== Manifestations ==
Youth Manjusri	Youth Manjusri (孺童文殊) is a typical form of Manjusri, one head, two arms, right hand holding a Wisdom Sword that can cut off ignorance, left hand holding a flower with a Prajna-paramita Sutra upon it.
Lion-riding Manjusri	Lion-riding Manjusri is another typical form of Manjusri frequently seen in Buddhist art across different Buddhist traditions. Manjusri is depicted as sitting on a lion, Wisdom Sword in one hand, and Prajna-paramita Sutra in another hand.
Four-Armed Manjusri	Four-Armed Manjusri is one of the five major forms of Manjusri. One head, four arms, holding four objects: sword, bow, arrow, and Prajna-paramita Sutra.
Undefiled Manjusri	Undefiled Manjusri, one of the five major forms of Manjusri, symbolizes the ever-pure nature of Prajna-paramita. One head, two arms, making Dharma-chakra Mudra, with Wisdom Sword and Prajna-paramita Sutra floating above his shoulders.
White Manjusri	White Manjusri is one of the five major forms of Manjusri. One head, two arms, making Wish-bestowing Mudra (Varada-mudra). The Wisdom Sword and Prajna-paramita Sutra are floating above his shoulders.
Six-Armed Manjusri	Six-Armed Manjusri is a powerful manifestation that liberates living beings from repetitive reincarnations among the Six realms of existence. This form of Manjusri has three heads and six arms, making Mudra with one or two hands, while the other hands holding different objects including Wisdom Sword, Prajna-paramita Sutra, bow, arrow, and flower.
Thousand Arms; Thousand Bowls and Thousand Sakyamunis Manjusri	A Vajrayana manifestation of Manjusri that has thousands of hands, each holding a bowl, from which a Sakyamuni Buddha manifests and then multiplies, becoming trillions of Sakyamuni Buddhas. Those countless Sakyamuni Buddhas, who are emanations from Vairocana Buddha, teach Dharma in countless worlds based on Manjusri the Great Wisdom, namely Prajñāpāramitā.
Black Manjusri	Black Manjusri is a wrathful manifestation of Manjusri, usually depicted as holding a Wisdom Sword in his right hand and a flower in his left hand with Prajnaparamita Sutra upon the flower.
Manjusri's Buddha form	Manjusri appears as a Buddha, with a Wisdom Sword in his hand, and Prajnaparamita Sutra floating above his shoulder. According to Mahayana Sutras, Manjusri is always a Buddha all the time, but just appears as a Bodhisattva in our world. Presently, he is a Buddha called Joy Store Mani Jewel Accumulation Tathāgata, whose Buddha-World is called Constant Joy.
Dharma-Realm; Speech; Self-existent; Manjusri	Dharma-Realm Speech Self-existent Manjusri (Sanskrit: Dharmadhātu-vāgīśvara Mañjuśrī) is a supreme manifestation of Manjusri. Four heads, eight arms, two hands making Dharma-chakra Mudra, while the others holding different objects: Wisdom Sword, Vajra Pestle, bow, arrow, and Prajna-paramita Sutra. This manifestation represents the Ultimate Reality, namely the Dharma-Body of all Buddhas.
Namasangiti Manjusri	A form of Manjusri based on Mañjuśrī-Nāma-Saṃgīti. One head, twelve arms, sitting, two hands in Dhyana Mudra, two hands above the head making Uttara-bodhi Mudra, two hands before chest making Dharma-chakra Mudra, two hands in Tarpana Mudra, four other hands holding four objects: Wisdom Sword, bow, arrow, and Prajna-paramita Sutra. This manifestation of Manjusri is the embodiment of Prajñāpāramitā, the Wisdom of all Buddhas.

== Iconography ==
Mañjuśrī is usually depicted as a male bodhisattva wielding a flaming sword in his right hand, representing the realization of transcendent wisdom which cuts down ignorance and duality. The scripture supported by the padma (lotus) held in his left hand is a Prajñāpāramitā sūtra, representing his attainment of ultimate realization from the blossoming of wisdom.

Mañjuśrī is often depicted as riding or seated on a blue lion, or sitting on the skin of a lion. This represents the use of wisdom to tame the mind, which is compared to riding or subduing a ferocious lion. In Chinese and Japanese Buddhist art, Mañjuśrī's sword is sometimes replaced with a ruyi scepter, especially in representations of his Vimalakirti Sutra discussion with the layman Vimalakirti. According to Berthold Laufer, the first Chinese representation of a ruyi was in an 8th-century Mañjuśrī painting by Wu Daozi, showing it held in his right hand taking the place of the usual sword. In subsequent Chinese and Japanese paintings of Buddhas, a ruyi was occasionally represented as a Padma with a long stem curved like a ruyi.

Another manifestation of Mañjuśrī that is venerated in Chinese Buddhist tradition is the Thousand-Armed and Thousand-Bowl Mañjuśrī^{[zh]} (千臂千缽文殊菩薩; Qiānbì Qiānbō Wénshū Púsà). The canonical source for this iconographic form is the "Mahāyana Yoga of the Adamantine Ocean, Mañjusrī with a Thousand Arms and Thousand Bowls: Great King of Tantras"^{[zh]} (大乘瑜伽金剛性海曼殊室利千臂千鉢大教王經; Dàchéng yújiā jīngāngxìng hǎi mànshūshìlì qiānbì qiānbō dàjiào wáng jīng), usually known simply as the "Sutra of Mañjusrī with a Thousand Arms and Thousand Bowls" (千臂千鉢曼殊室利經; Qiānbì qiānbō mànshūshìlì jīng). In this manifestation, Mañjuśrī is depicted with a thousand arms, each holding an alms bowl, with each bowl containing a figure of Śākyamuni Buddha.

He is one of the Four Great Bodhisattvas of Chinese Buddhism, the other three being Kṣitigarbha, Avalokiteśvara, and Samantabhadra. In China, he is often paired with Samantabhadra.

In Tibetan Buddhism, Mañjuśrī is sometimes depicted in a trinity with Avalokiteśvara and Vajrapāṇi.

== Mantras ==
=== Arapacana mantra ===
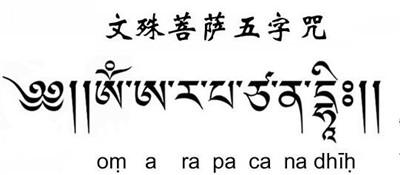
Manjusri's Five-Syllabled Mantra

A mantra commonly associated with Mañjuśrī is the following:

oṃ arapacana dhīḥ

The Arapacana is a syllabary consisting of forty-two letters, and is named after the first five letters: a, ra, pa, ca, na. This syllabary was most widely used for the Gāndhārī language with the Kharoṣṭhī script but also appears in some Sanskrit texts. The syllabary features in Mahāyāna texts such as the longer Prajñāpāramitā texts, the Gaṇḍavyūha Sūtra, the Lalitavistara Sūtra, the Avataṃsaka Sūtra, the Dharmaguptaka Vinaya, and the Mūlasarvāstivāda Vinaya. In some of these texts, the Arapacana syllabary serves as a mnemonic for important Mahāyāna concepts. Due to its association with him, Arapacana may even serve as an alternate name for Mañjuśrī.

The Sutra on Perfect Wisdom (Conze 1975) defines the significance of each syllable thus:

1. A is a door to the insight that all dharmas are unproduced from the very beginning (ādya-anutpannatvād).
2. RA is a door to the insight that all dharmas are without dirt (rajas).
3. PA is a door to the insight that all dharmas have been expounded in the ultimate sense (paramārtha).
4. CA is a door to the insight that the decrease (cyavana) or rebirth of any dharma cannot be apprehended, because all dharmas do not decrease, nor are they reborn.
5. NA is a door to the insight that the names (i.e. nāma) of all dharmas have vanished; the essential nature behind names cannot be gained or lost.

Tibetan pronunciation is slightly different and so the Tibetan characters read: oṃ a ra pa tsa na dhīḥ (Tibetan: ༀ་ཨ་ར་པ་ཙ་ན་དྷཱི༔, Wylie: om a ra pa tsa na d+hIH). In Tibetan tradition, this mantra is believed to enhance wisdom and improve one's skills in debating, memory, writing, and other literary abilities. "Dhīḥ" is the seed syllable of the mantra and is chanted with greater emphasis and also repeated a number of times as a decrescendo.

=== Transliterations ===
Chinese: 唵啊囉跛者曩諦
Tibetan: ཨོཾ་ཨ་ར་པ་ཙ་ན་དྷཱིཿ།
Manchu: ᢀᠣ ᠠᠷᠠᢒᠠᢜᠠᠨᠠ ᢡᠢᠢᢁ
Sanskrit: ॐ अरपचन धीः

=== Other mantras ===
According to the Mañjuśrīmūlakalpa, "the ultimate heart essence of Mañjuśrī, which accomplishes all endeavors" is the following mantra:

Namaḥ sarvabuddhānām oṁ maṁ

The Sādhanamālā also contains a popular mantra which refers to Mañjuśrī as the "lord of speech" (Vāgīśvara):

Oṃ Vāgīśvara Mūḥ

This mantra is very popular in Nepal, where Vāgīśvara Mañjuśrī is a popular deity. Another Mañjuśrī mantra is the mantra for Mañjuvajra, a tantric form of Mañjuśrī associated with the Guhyasamaja tradition, it is:

Oṃ Mañjuvajra Hūṃ

== In Buddhist cultures ==
=== In China ===
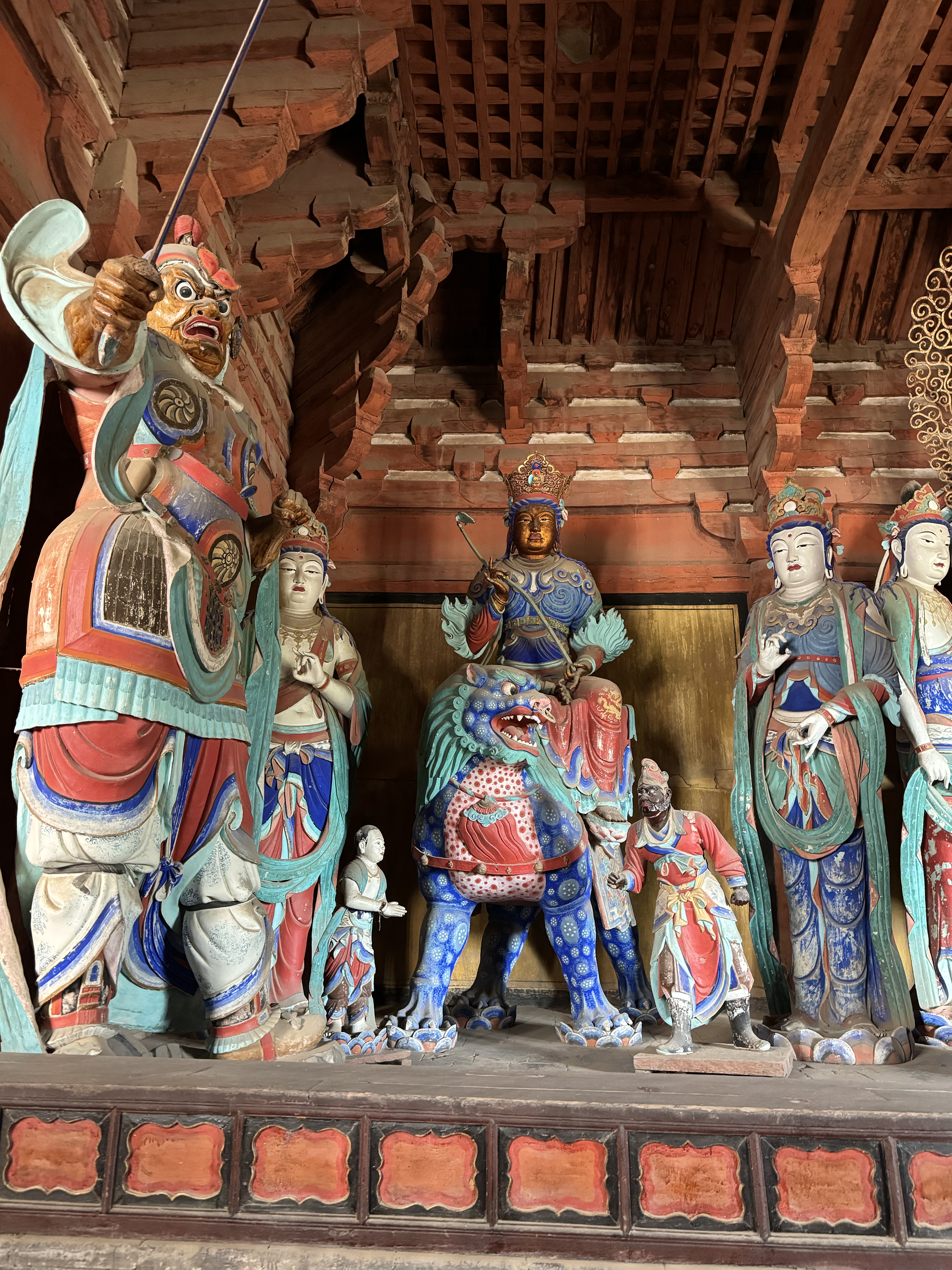
Tang dynasty (618-907) statues of Manjushri (Wenshu) surrounded by attendant bodhisattvas and a heavenly king at the Dongda Temple of Foguang Temple in Wutai, Shanxi, China.

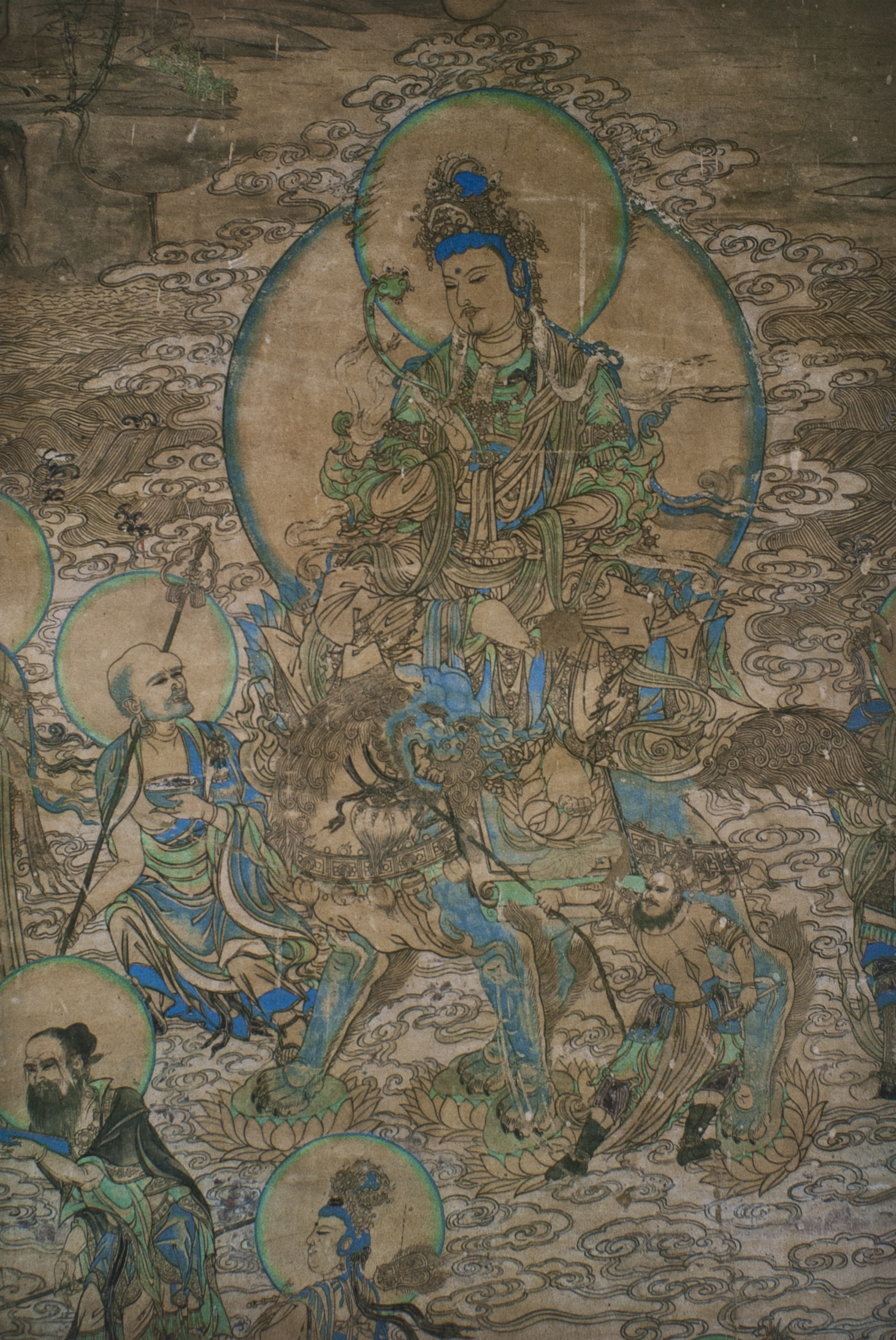
A painting of Wenshu (Mañjuśrī) from the Yulin Caves of Gansu, China, from the Tangut-led Western Xia dynasty

Mañjuśrī is known in China as Wenshu (Chinese: 文殊; pinyin: Wénshū). Mount Wutai in Shanxi, one of the four Sacred Mountains of China, is considered by Chinese Buddhists to be his bodhimaṇḍa. He was said to bestow spectacular visionary experiences to those on selected mountain peaks and caves there. In Mount Wutai's Foguang Temple, the Wenshu Hall to the right of its main hall was recognized to have been built in 1137 during the Jin dynasty. The hall was thoroughly studied, mapped and first photographed by early twentieth-century Chinese architects Liang Sicheng and Lin Huiyin. These made it a popular place of pilgrimage, but patriarchs including Linji Yixuan and Yunmen Wenyan declared the mountain off limits.

Mount Wutai was also associated with the East Mountain Teaching. Mañjuśrī has been associated with Mount Wutai since ancient times. Paul Williams writes:

Apparently the association of Mañjuśrī with Wutai (Wu-t'ai) Shan in north China was known in classical times in India itself, identified by Chinese scholars with the mountain in the 'north-east' (when seen from India or Central Asia) referred to as the abode of Mañjuśrī in the Avataṃsaka Sūtra. There are said to have been pilgrimages from India and other Asian countries to Wutai Shan by the seventh century.

According to official histories from the Qing dynasty, Nurhaci, a military leader of the Jurchens of Northeast China and founder of what became the Qing dynasty, named his tribe after Mañjuśrī as the Manchus. The true origin of the name Manchu is disputed.

Monk Hanshan (寒山) is widely considered to be a metaphorical manifestation of Wenshu. He is known for having co-written the following famous poem about reincarnation with monk Shide:

Drumming your grandpa in the shrine,
Cooking your aunts in the pot,
Marrying your grandma in the past,
Should I laugh or not?

堂上打鼓打公皮，
鍋內煎煮是姑娘，
三世祖母娶為婦，
我今不笑等何時。

=== In Tibet ===
In Tibetan Buddhism, Mañjuśrī manifests in a number of different Tantric forms. Yamāntaka (meaning 'terminator of Yama i.e. Death') is the wrathful manifestation of Mañjuśrī, popular within the Gelug school of Tibetan Buddhism. Other variations upon his traditional form as Mañjuśrī include Namasangiti, Arapacana Manjushri, etc. In Tibetan Buddhism, Mañjuśrī is also an yidam. The Emperor Manjushri as a honorific title was also given to Qing emperors such as the Qianlong Emperor.

In the Taoist pantheon, Mañjuśrī is adopted as a Taoist deity known as Wenshu Guangfa Tianzun. This deity appears in the Ming Dynasty novel Fengshen Yanyi as a senior disciple of Yuanshi Tianzun, the highest deity in Taoism. However, the books Qunxian Xianpo Tianmen and Western Tang Dynasty Biography state that Wenshu Guangfa Tianzun and Mañjuśrī Bodhisattva are not the same person.

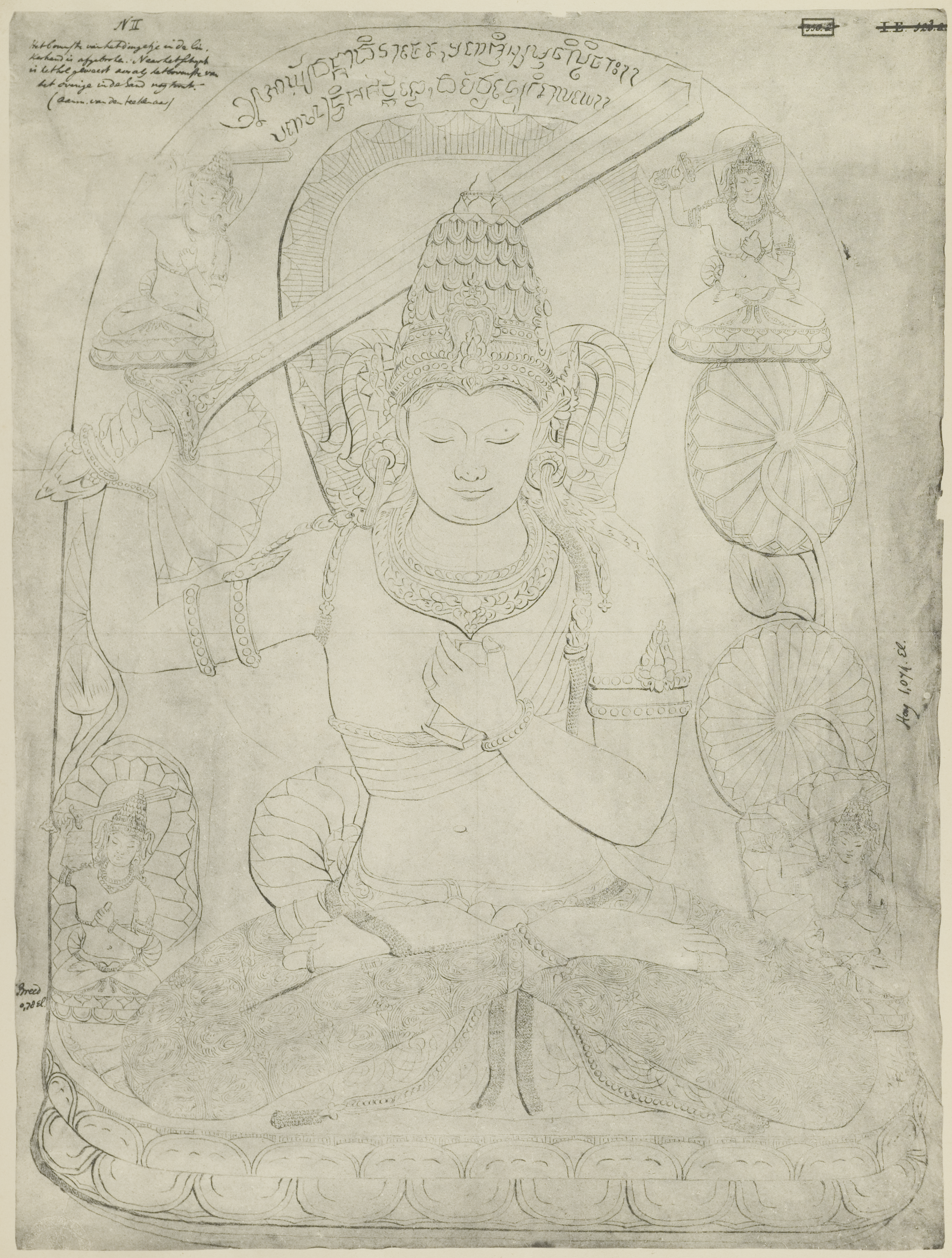
Black and white chalk drawing of a Mañjusri statue from Singhasari temple (East Java, Indonesia), probably made in 1823 by J.Th. Bik in Batavia

=== In Korea ===
In Korea, Mañjuśrī is known as Munsu Bosal (문수보살). A prominent legend recounts how the monk Jajang-yulsa traveled to China and encountered Munsu Bosal on Mount Wutai, a sacred site traditionally associated with Mañjuśrī. According to the story, Munsu Bosal instructed Jajang to find a similar five-peaked mountain in Korea and to establish a temple there. Jajang later identified such a place in the Korean Peninsula, which became Odaesan, now one of the most revered sacred mountains in Korean Buddhism.

Another well-known legend involves King Sejo of Joseon, who, in his later years, suffered from a painful and incurable skin disease that even the royal physicians could not treat. Believing the illness to be karmic retribution for his usurpation of the throne from his nephew, King Danjong, Sejo undertook pilgrimages to major Buddhist temples to seek healing. While visiting Sangwonsa Temple near Odaesan, Sejo is said to have been bathing in a nearby stream when a young boy (dongja) appeared and offered to scrub his back. As the boy washed him, the king's pain began to subside. Sejo confided that his illness was a closely guarded secret, to which the boy replied, "You must also promise never to tell anyone that you have seen Munsu Bosal." The boy then vanished without a trace. That evening, the king's skin disease was miraculously cured. In gratitude for what he believed to be divine intervention, King Sejo commissioned the creation of the Wooden Seated Child Manjusri, a statue depicting Mañjuśrī in the form of the young boy who had healed him. The statue, now enshrined at Sangwonsa Temple, was later designated as the 221st National Treasure of South Korea.

=== In Nepal ===
According to Swayambhu Purana, the Kathmandu Valley was once a lake. It is believed that Mañjuśrī came on a pilgrimage from his earthly abode-Wutaishan (five-peaked mountain) in China. He saw a lotus flower in the center of the lake, which emitted brilliant radiance. He cut a gorge at Chovar with his flaming sword to allow the lake to drain. The place where the lotus flower settled became the great Swayambhunath Stupa, and the valley thus became habitable.

=== In Indonesia ===
In eighth century Java during the Mataram kingdom, Mañjuśrī was a prominent deity revered by the Sailendra dynasty, patrons of Mahayana Buddhism. The Kelurak inscription (782) and Manjusrigrha inscription (792) mentioned about the construction of a grand Prasada named Vajrāsana Mañjuśrīgṛha (Vajra House of Mañjuśrī) identified today as Sewu temple, located just 800 meters north of the Prambanan. Sewu is the second largest Buddhist temple in Central Java after Borobudur. The depiction of Mañjuśrī in Sailendra art is similar to those of the Pala Empire style of Nalanda, Bihar. Mañjuśrī was portrayed as a youthful handsome man with the palm of his hands tattooed with the image of a flower. His right hand is facing down with an open palm while his left-hand holds an utpala (blue lotus). He also uses the necklace made of tiger canine teeth.

== Other culture ==
- Manzaširi - A primeval giant in Kalmyk mythology, whose body formed the world. The name is likely a corruption of Manjushri.

In Hinduism especially in Tantras like Kkuteshvara Tantra and Bhairava Tantra Lord Manjughosha is seen as a manifestation of god Shiva. He has 5 jewels on his head. He is considered as youth in appearance. He holds a sword in one hand and a book on other. He is worshipped for gaining knowledge, wealth and his mantra practice may help in conquering devas and daitya ganas.

== Gallery ==
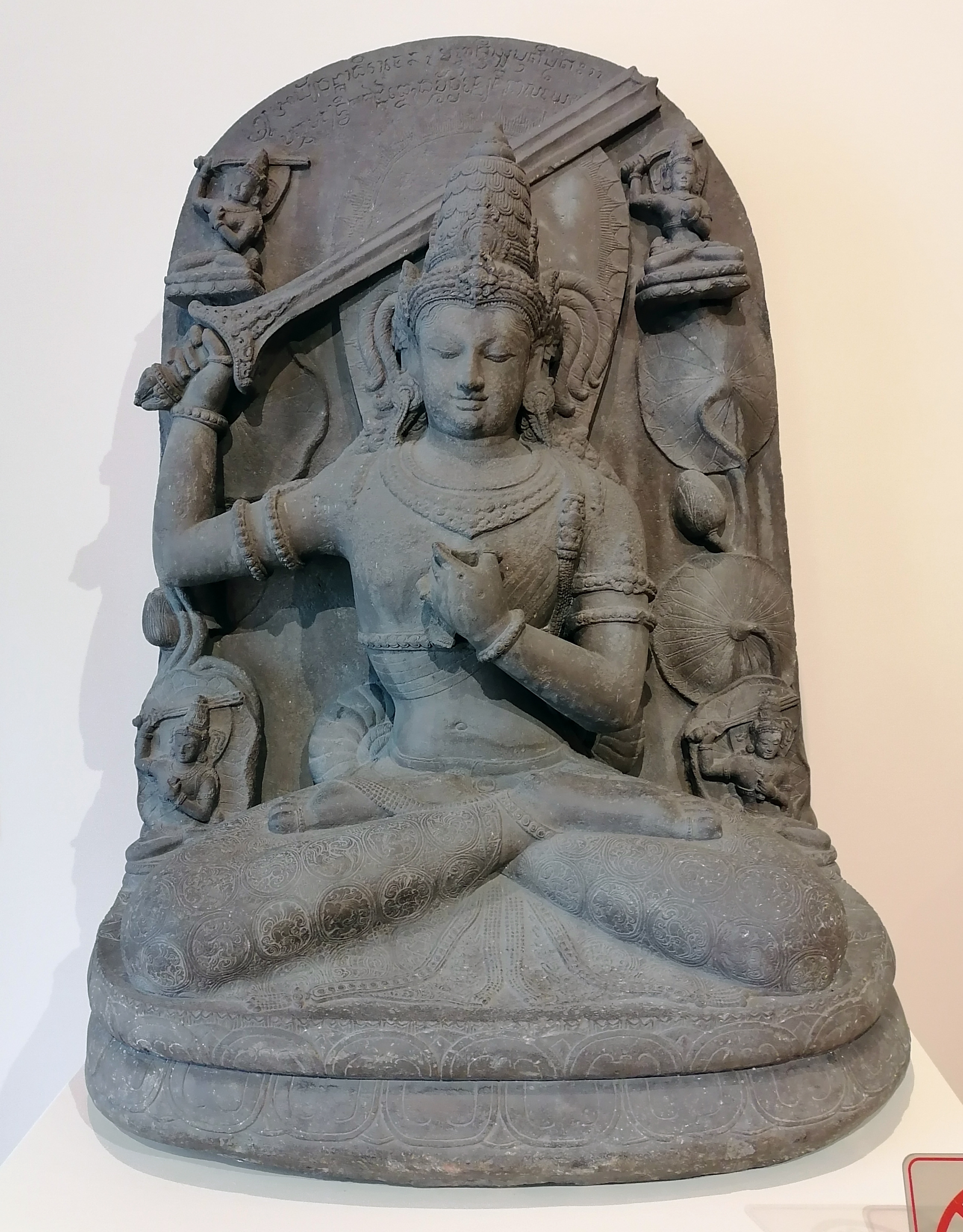
Mañjuśrī figure from Candi Jago, 14th century Java, Indonesia

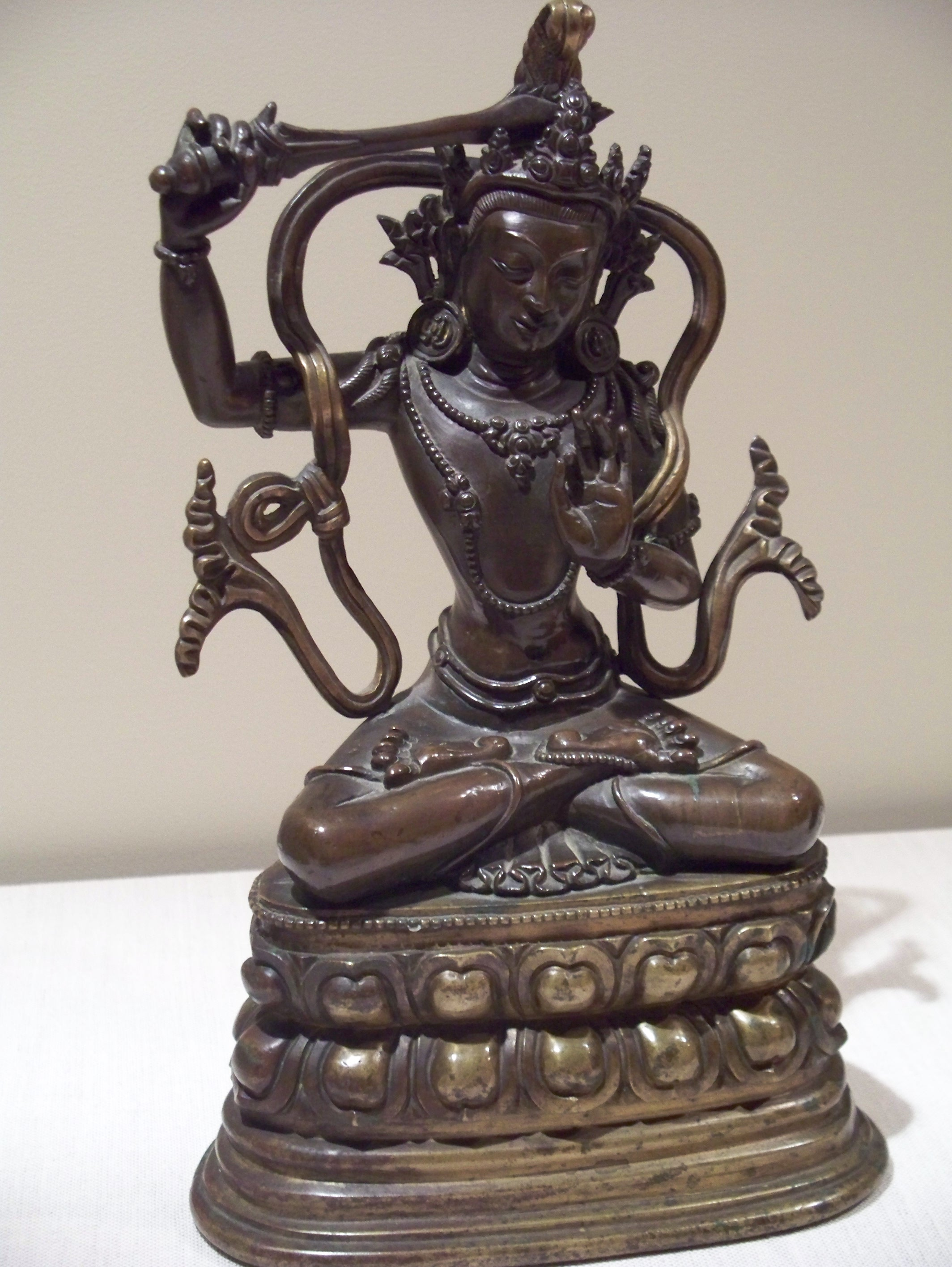
Mañjuśrī figure brandishing sword of wisdom in Nepal

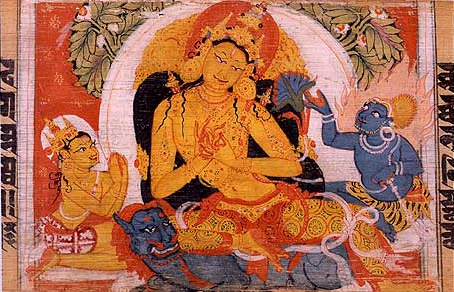
Palm leaf manuscript painting of Mañjuśrī. Nalanda, Bihar, India.

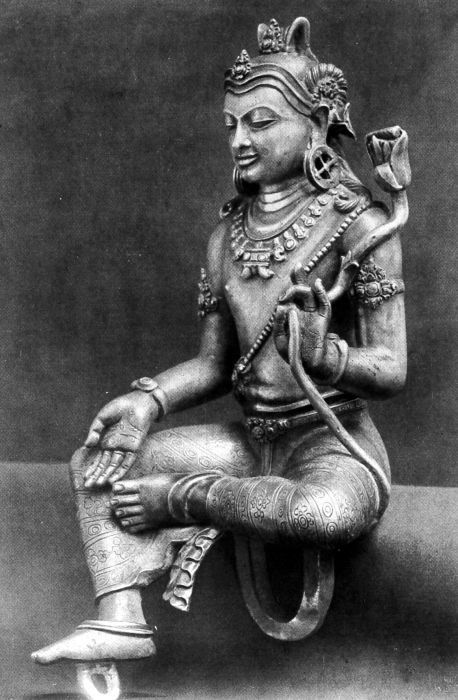
Silver figure of Mañjuśrī holding a long-stemmed lotus. Central Java, Indonesia.

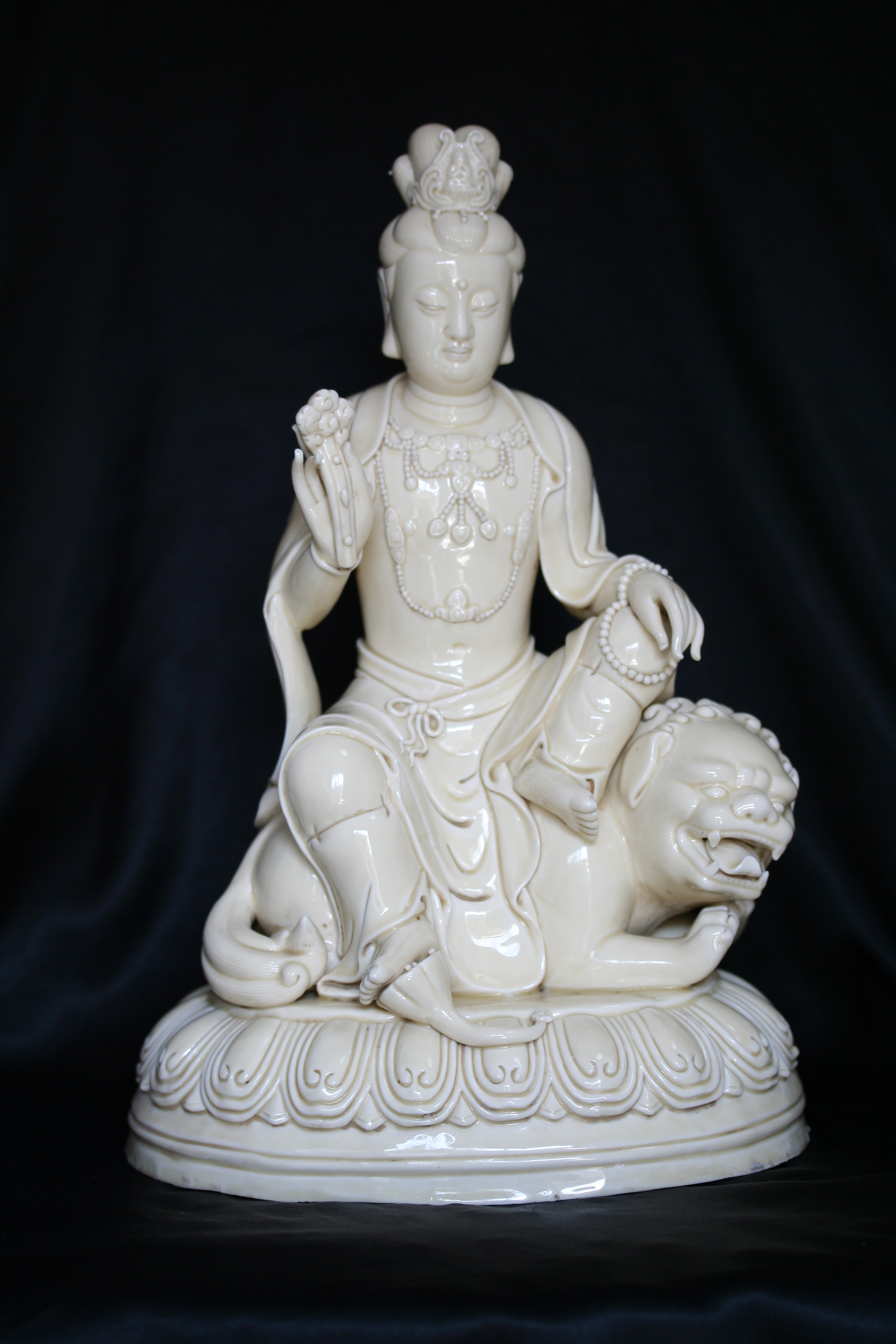
Blanc de Chine figure of Mañjuśrī holding a ruyi scepter. China, 17th century.

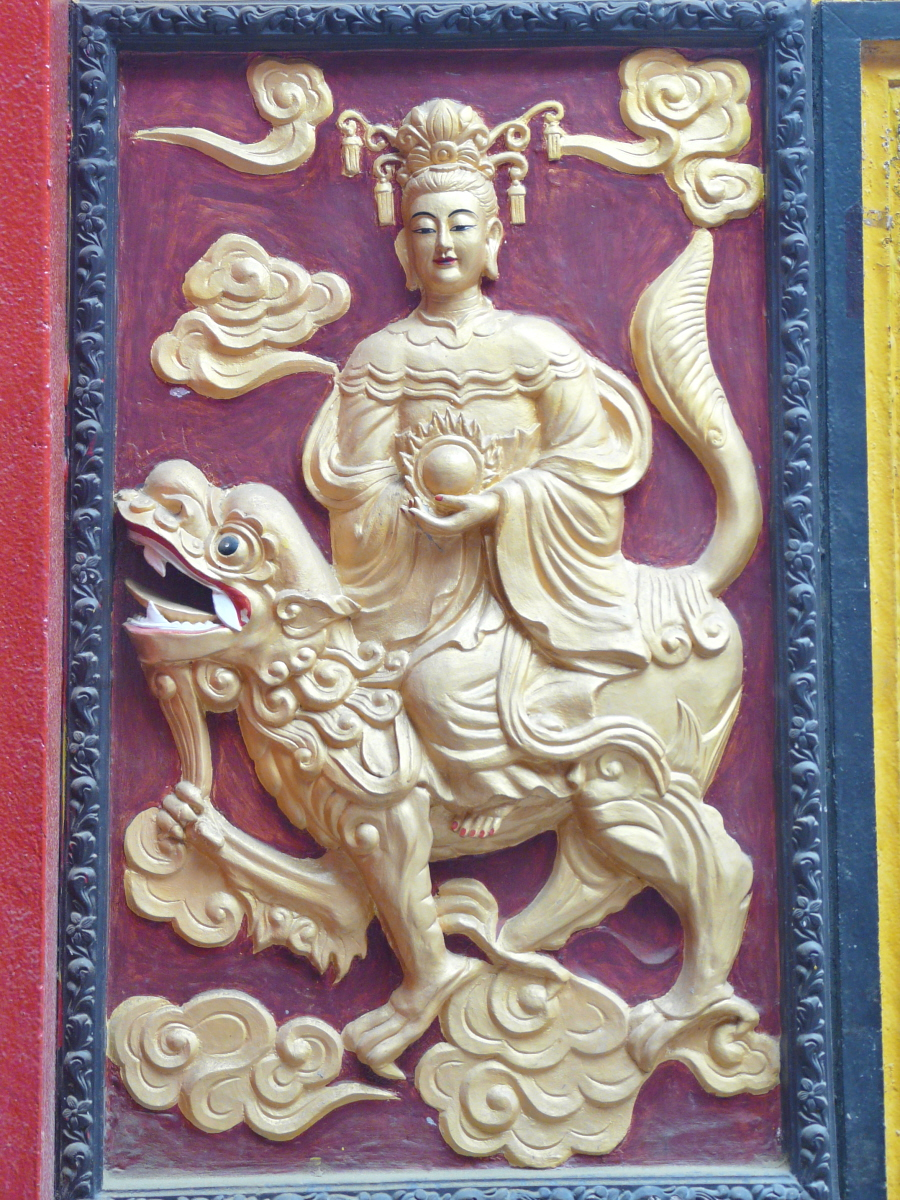
Mañjuśrī on lion with cintamani. Quan Am Temple, Ho Chi Minh City.

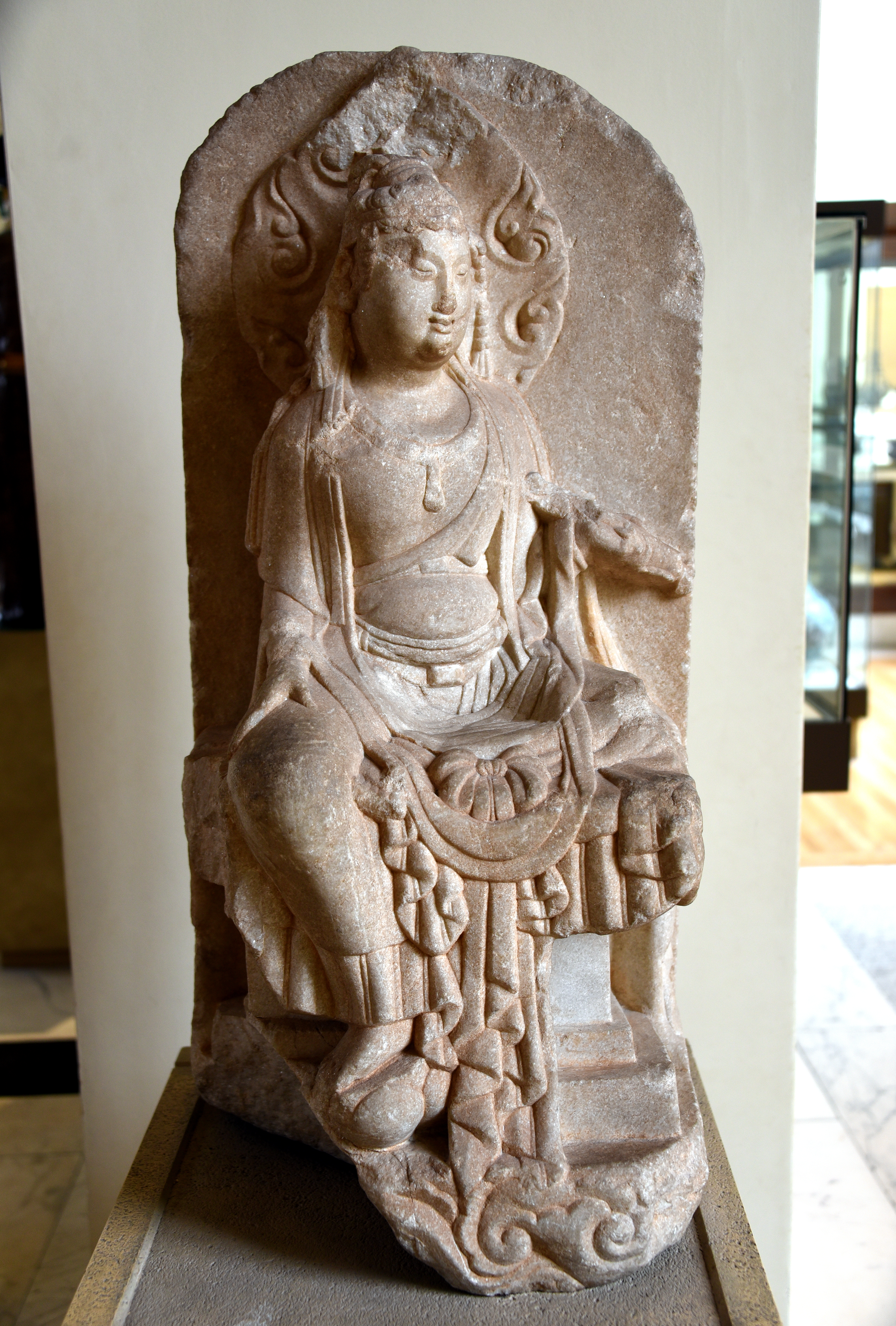
Bodhisattva Manjushri seated in lalitasana, from China, Jin Dynasty, 12th century CE. British Museum.

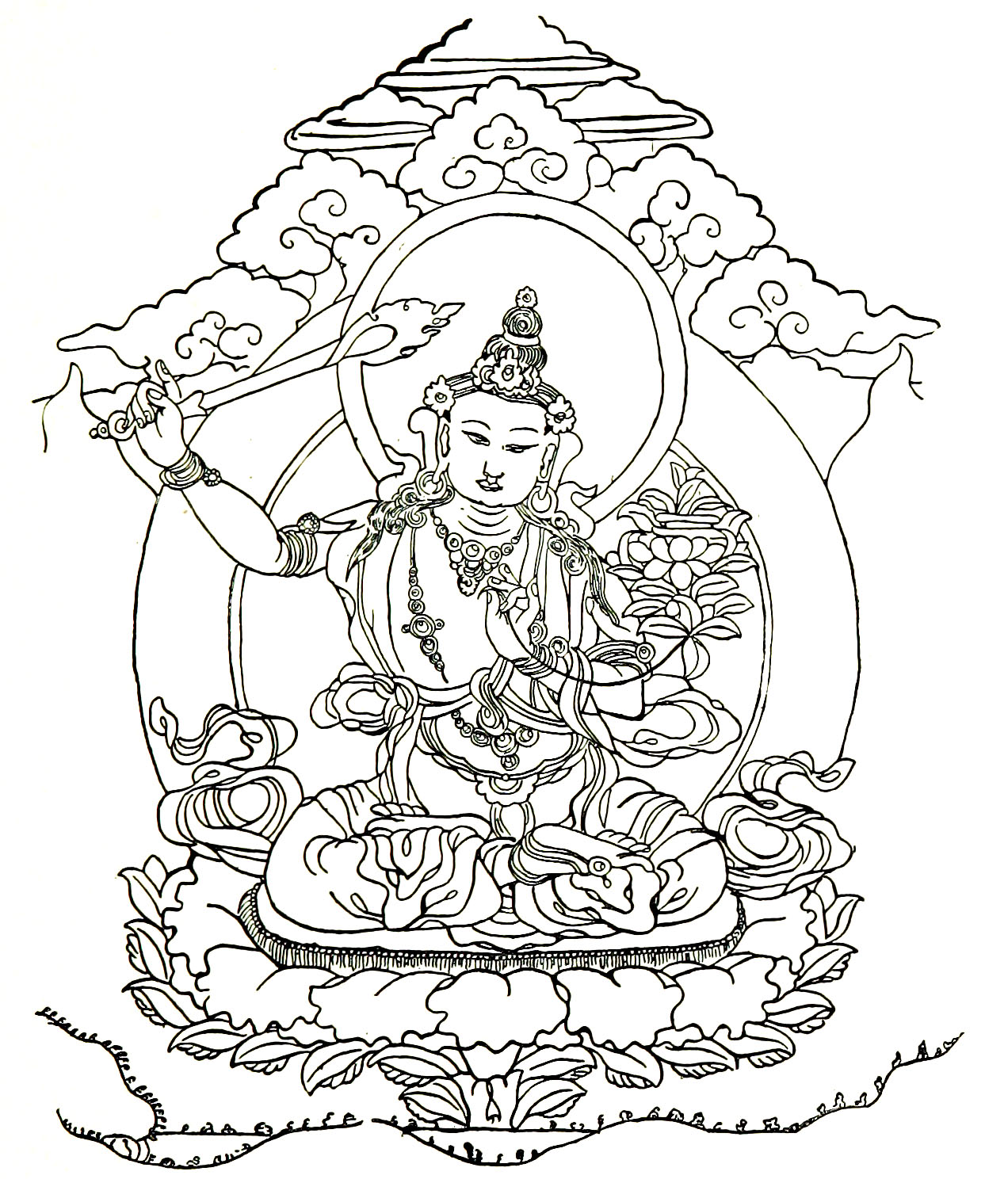
Drawing of Mañjuśrī, Bodhisattva of Wisdom

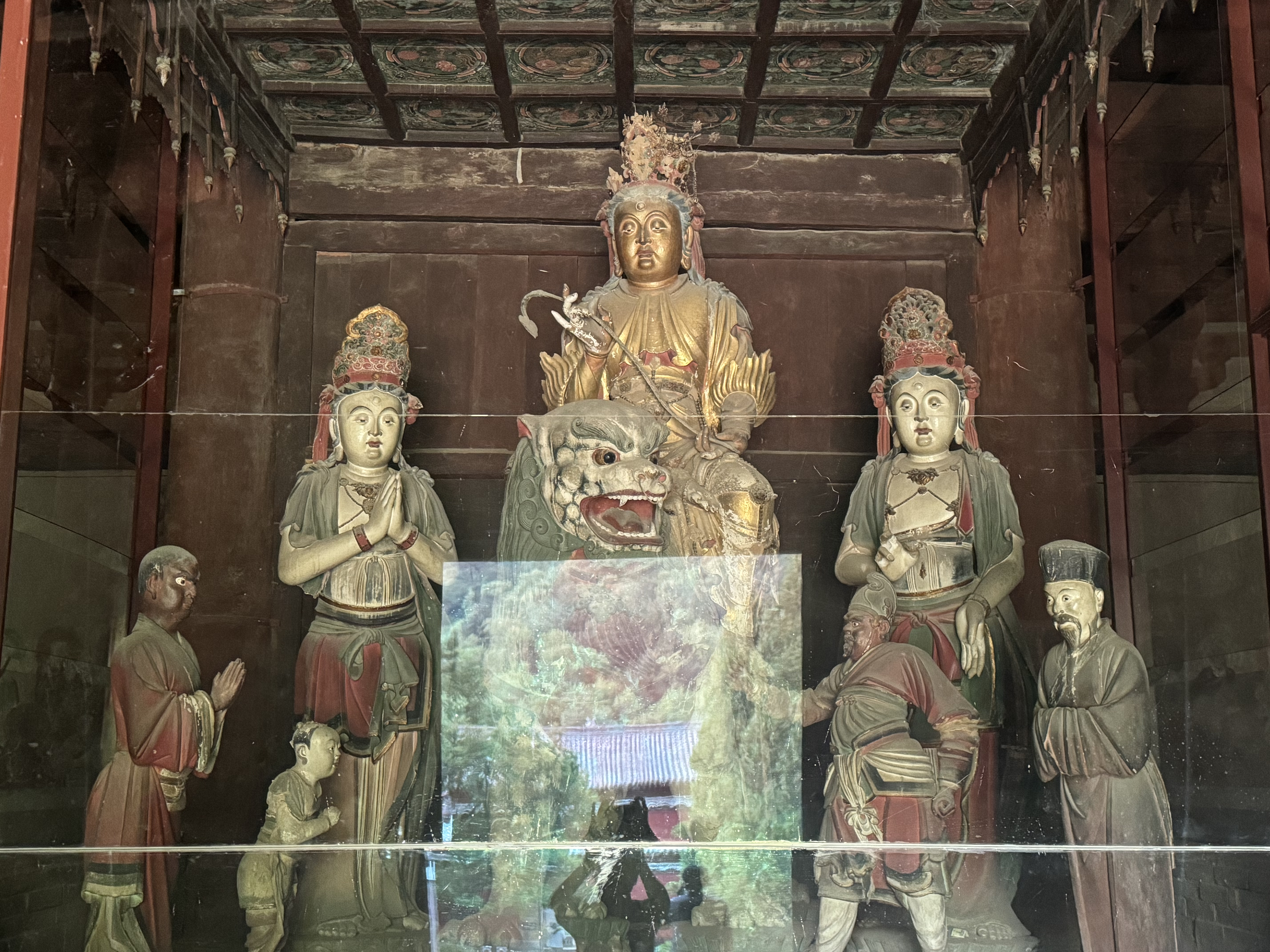
Tang dynasty (618-907) statues of Manjushri (Wenshu) surrounded by attendant bodhisattvas at the Wenshu Hall of Foguang Temple in Wutai, Shanxi, China

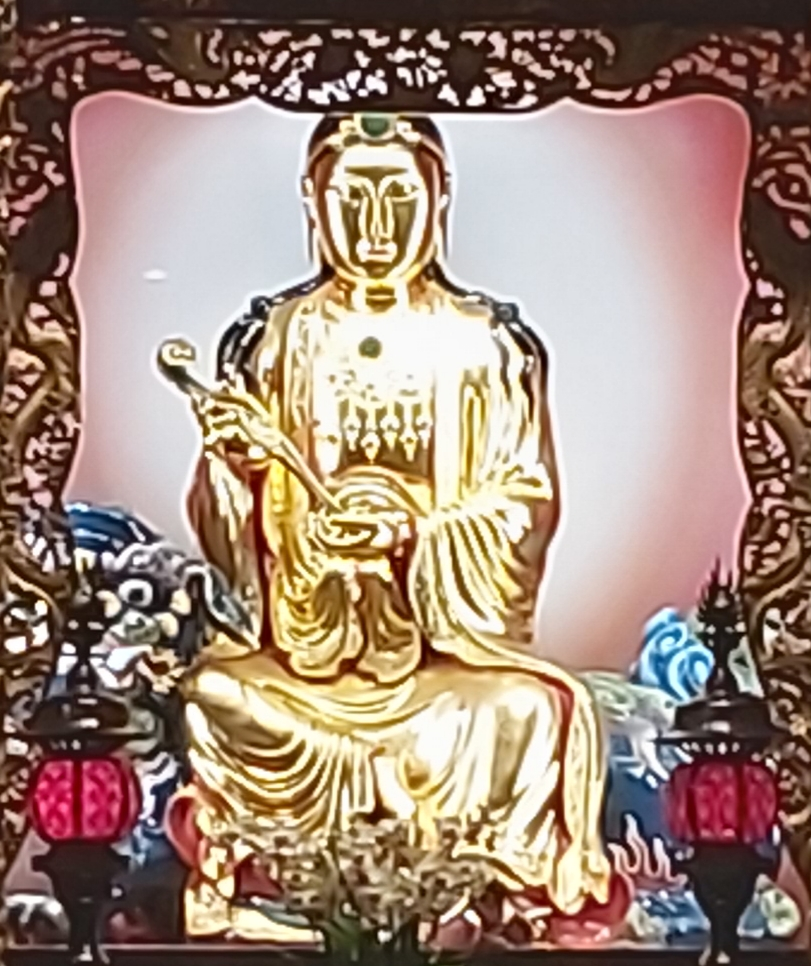
Statue of Mañjuśrī at Bangka Lungshan Temple, Taipei

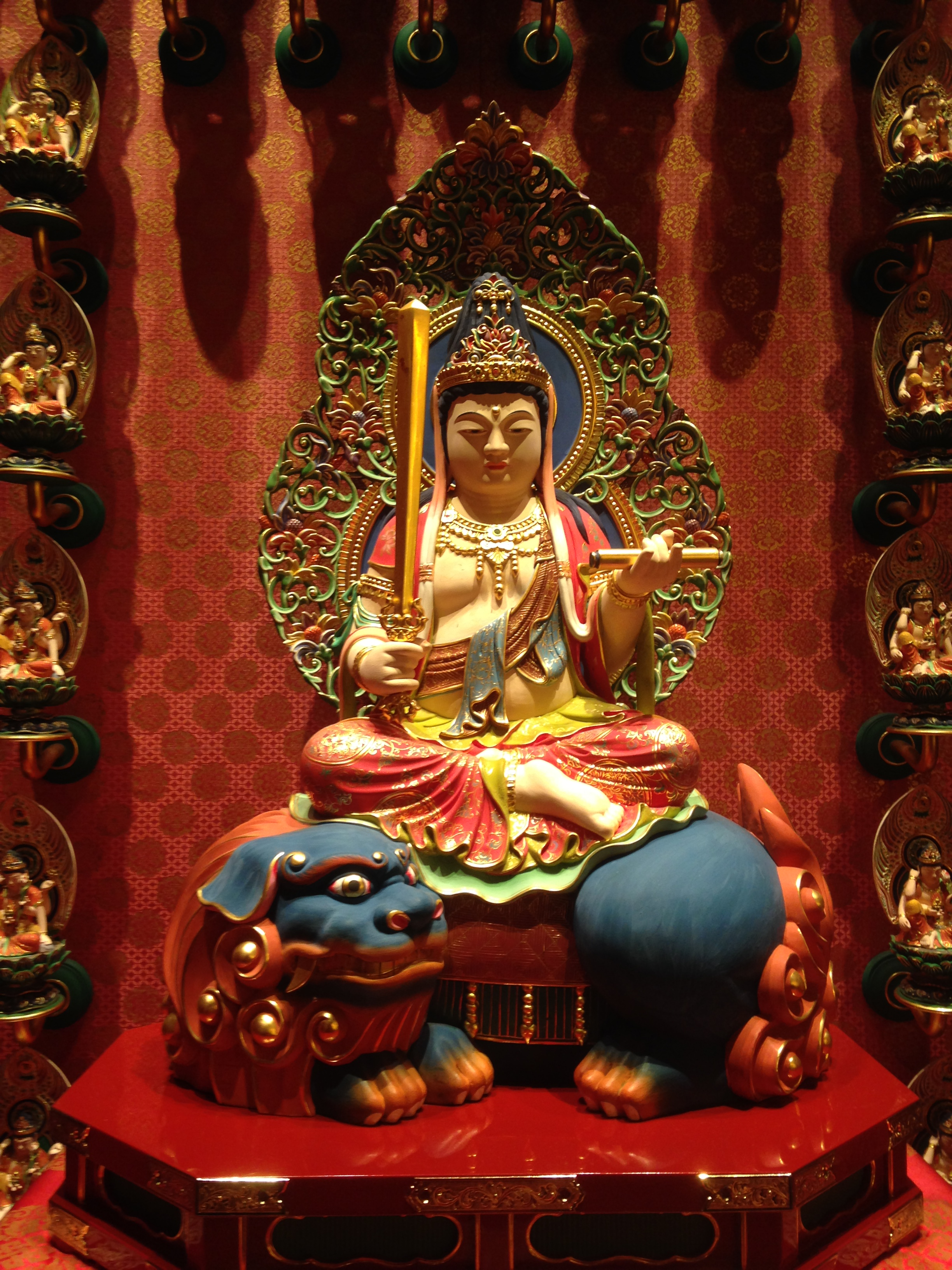
Manjushri, seated on a blue lion at Buddha Tooth Relic Temple and Museum, Singapore

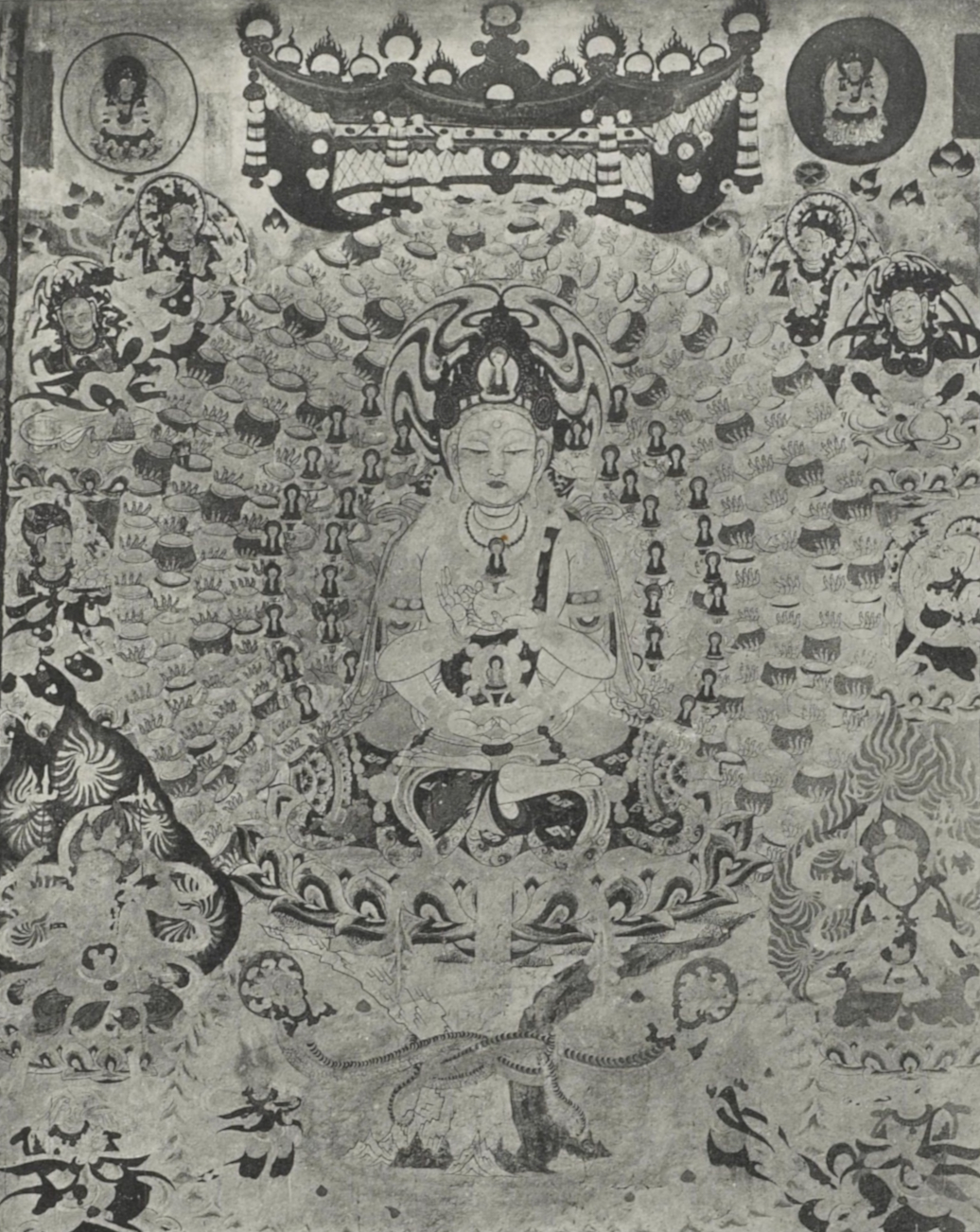
Mural of the Thousand-Armed and Thousand-Bowl Mañjuśrī in Cave 144 of the Mogao Grottoes in Dunhuang, China. Photographed by Paul Pelliot in 1908.

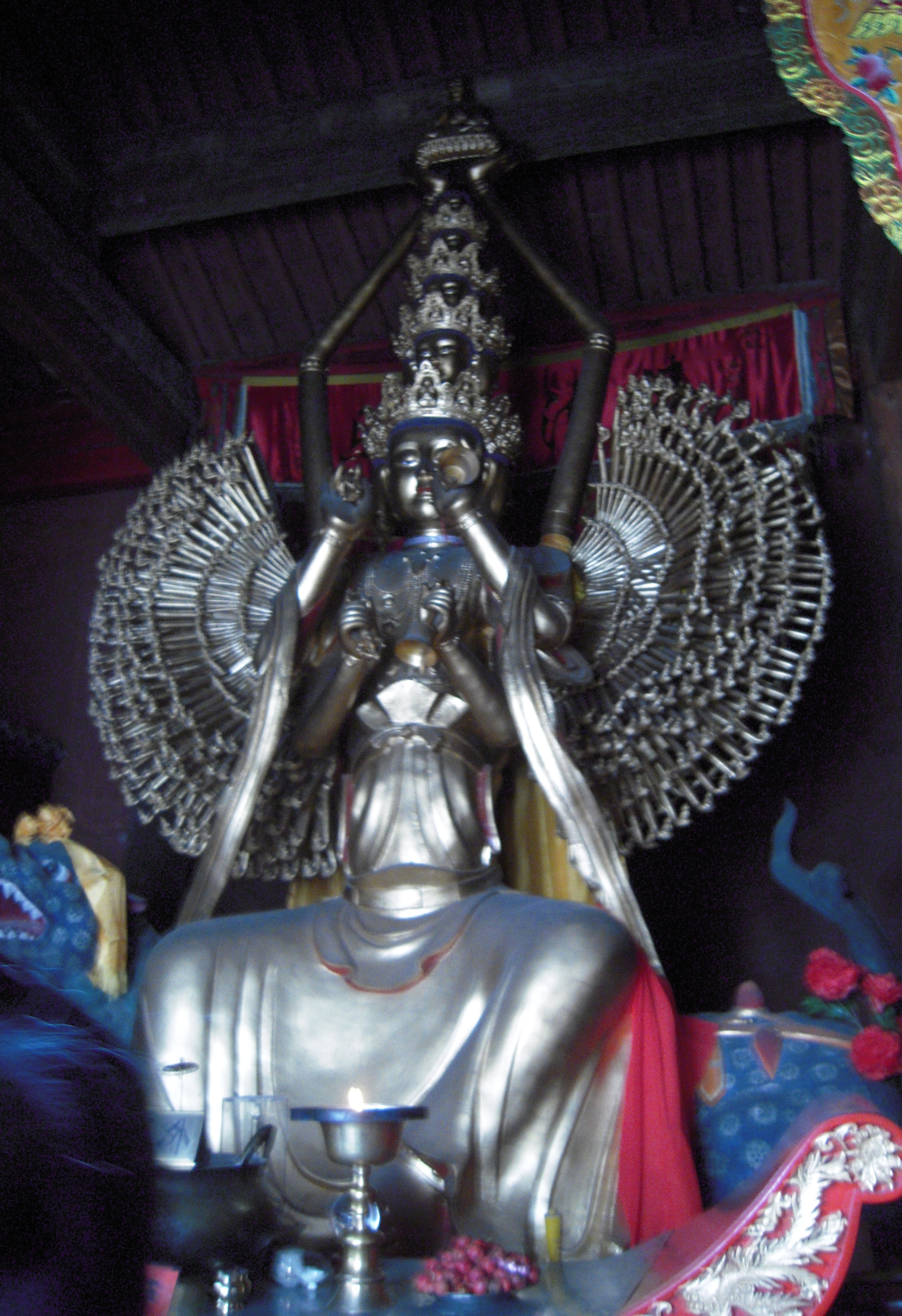
Statue of the Thousand-Armed and Thousand-Bowl Mañjuśrī in Xiantong Temple at Mount Wutai, China

== See also ==
- Mañjuśrīmitra
- Manjusri Monastery
- Washing the Elephant
