= Ding Yunpeng =

Chinese painter

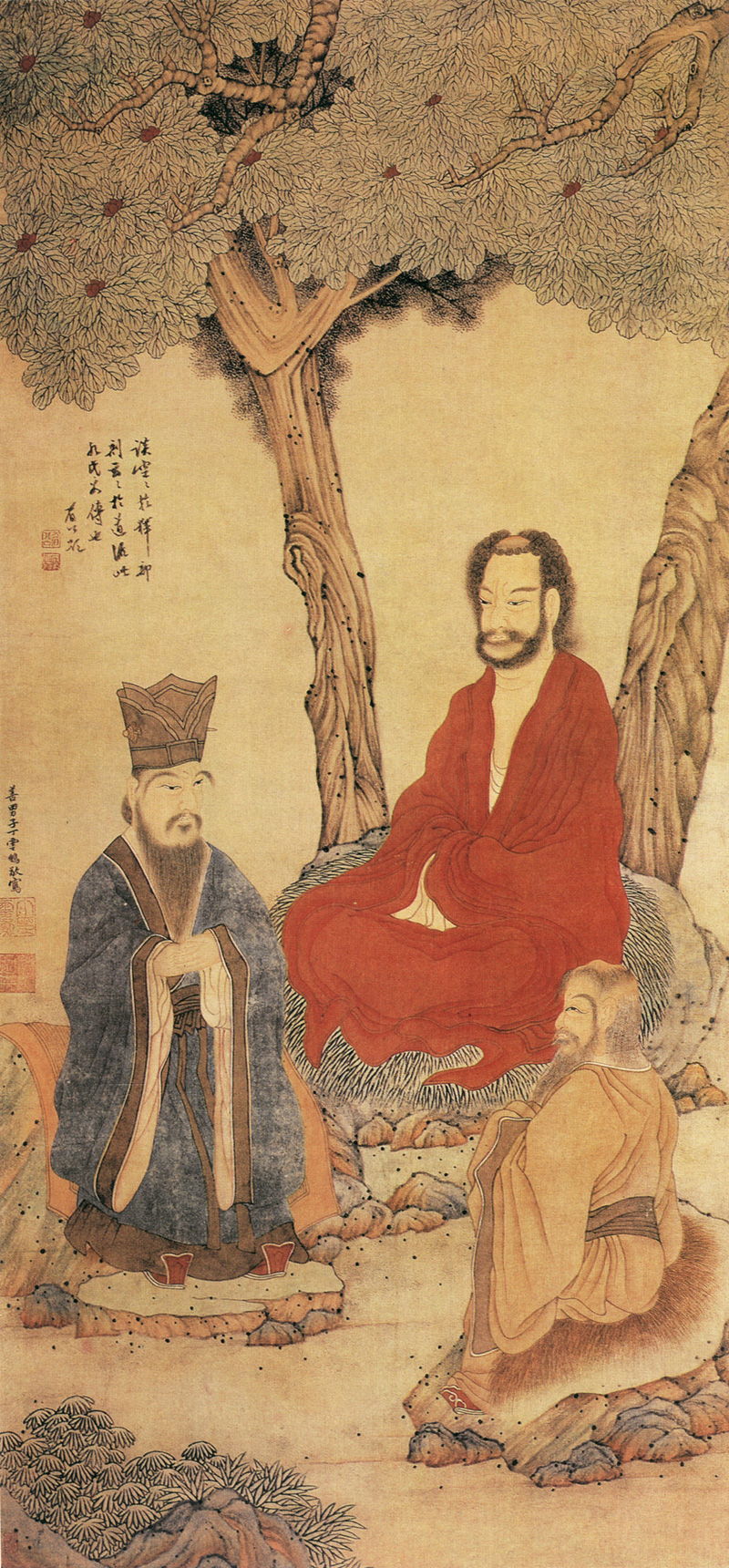
Confucius, Lao-tzu and Buddhist Arhat, Ding Yunpeng, Palace Museum, Beijing

Ding Yunpeng (Ting Yün-p'eng, traditional: 丁雲鵬, simplified: 丁云鹏; c. 1547 – 1628) was a Chinese painter especially of human figures and landscapes during the Ming dynasty (1368–1644).

Ding was born in Xiuning in the Anhui province. His style name was 'Nanyu' and his sobriquet was 'Shenghua jushi'. Ding's painting followed the style of Qiu Ying, similar to paintings from the Song dynasty. Ding used pure and minute brush strokes for a strong and terse look and feel.

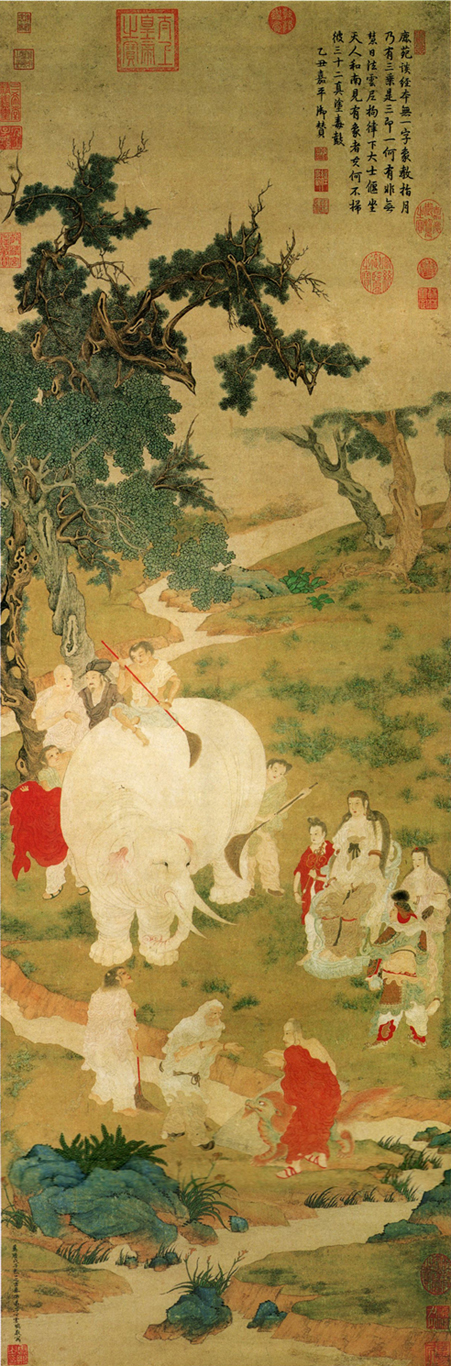
Ding Yunpeng, Sweeping the White Elephant, National Palace Museum
