= Ding Guanpeng =

Chinese painter

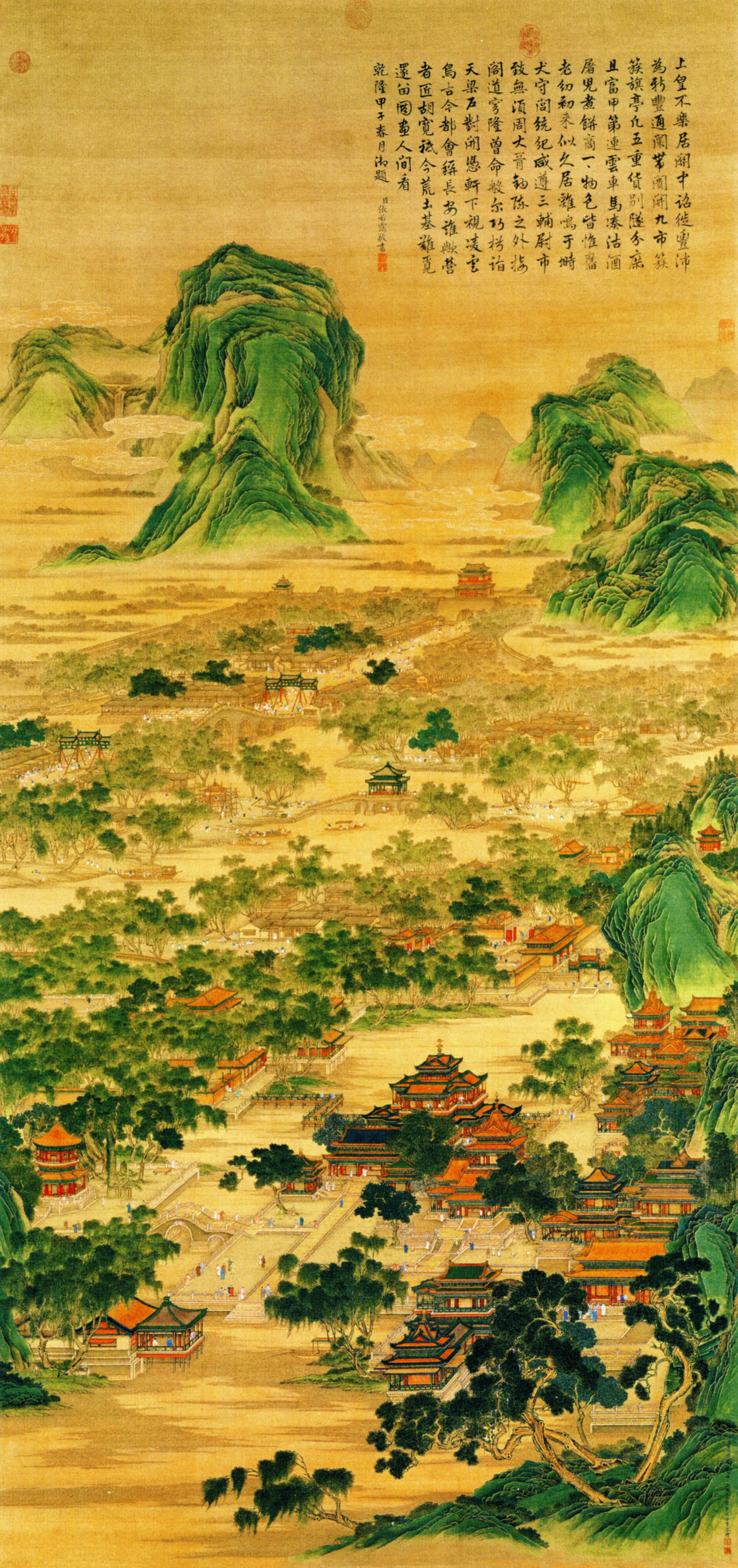
Ding Guanpeng, The Feng City portion of Chang'an during the time of Liu Bang at the start of the Han Dynasty

Ding Guanpeng (traditional Chinese: 丁觀鵬; simplified Chinese: 丁观鹏; pinyin: Dīng Guānpéng; Wade–Giles: Ting Kuan-p'eng) (active 1708–1771) was a Chinese painter who lived during the Qing dynasty.

A native of Beijing, he was active from the later part of the Kangxi era (1661–1722) to the middle part of the Qianlong era (1735–96). At one point he studied oil painting under Giuseppe Castiglione. He was noted for painting people and landscapes. He spent about 50 years in the Palace Painting Academy and drew nearly 200 pieces.

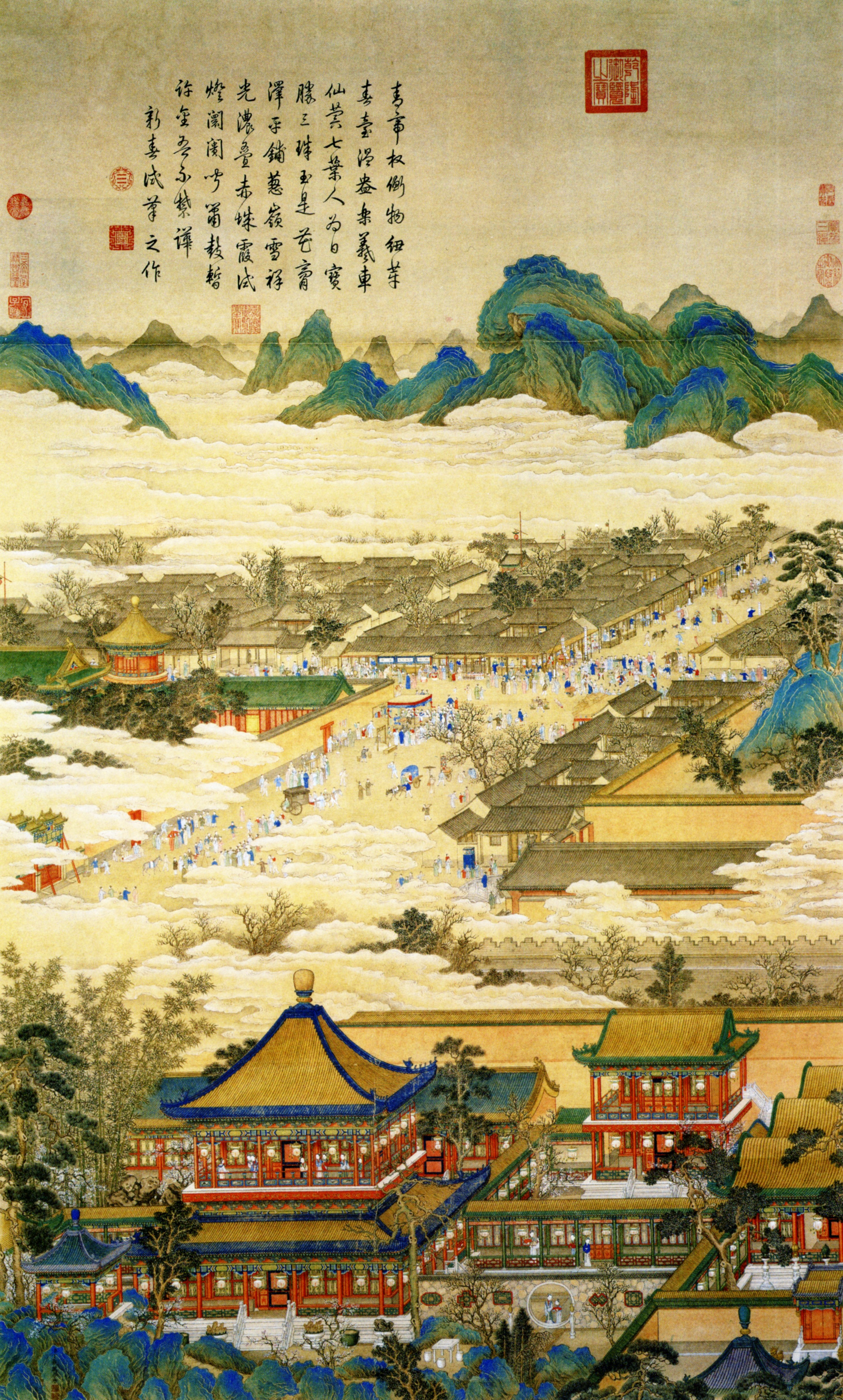
Ding Guanpeng, Peaceful Start for the New Year, ink and color on paper.

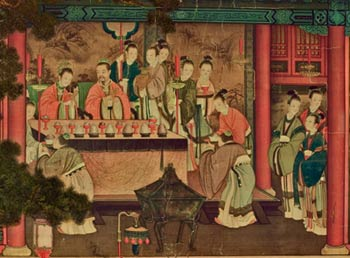
Ding Guanpeng, Xiwangmu visiting Emperor Wu of Han.
