= Royal girdle of Korea =

Royal Korean accessories

- Hangul: 금제 과대
- Hanja: 金製銙帶
- RR: geumje gwadae
- MR: kŭmje kwadae

Several gold girdles of Korea have been excavated. They were symbols of royalty and status, but lesser belts were also worn by governmental officials. These belts have been found in the tombs of Silla and Baekje kings, queens, and the lesser nobility. The lesser girdles can be distinguished based on their size, material, and color. All royal girdles follow a general scheme. The royal girdles are made from pure gold metal plates attached to each other and are adorned with many charms, such as gogok. The symbolism of these charms and their significance has yet been fully ascertained. The practice of wearing girdles probably derives from Chinese traditions. They were generally accessories that were either worn on a crown or pieces of jewellery that symbolized wealth.

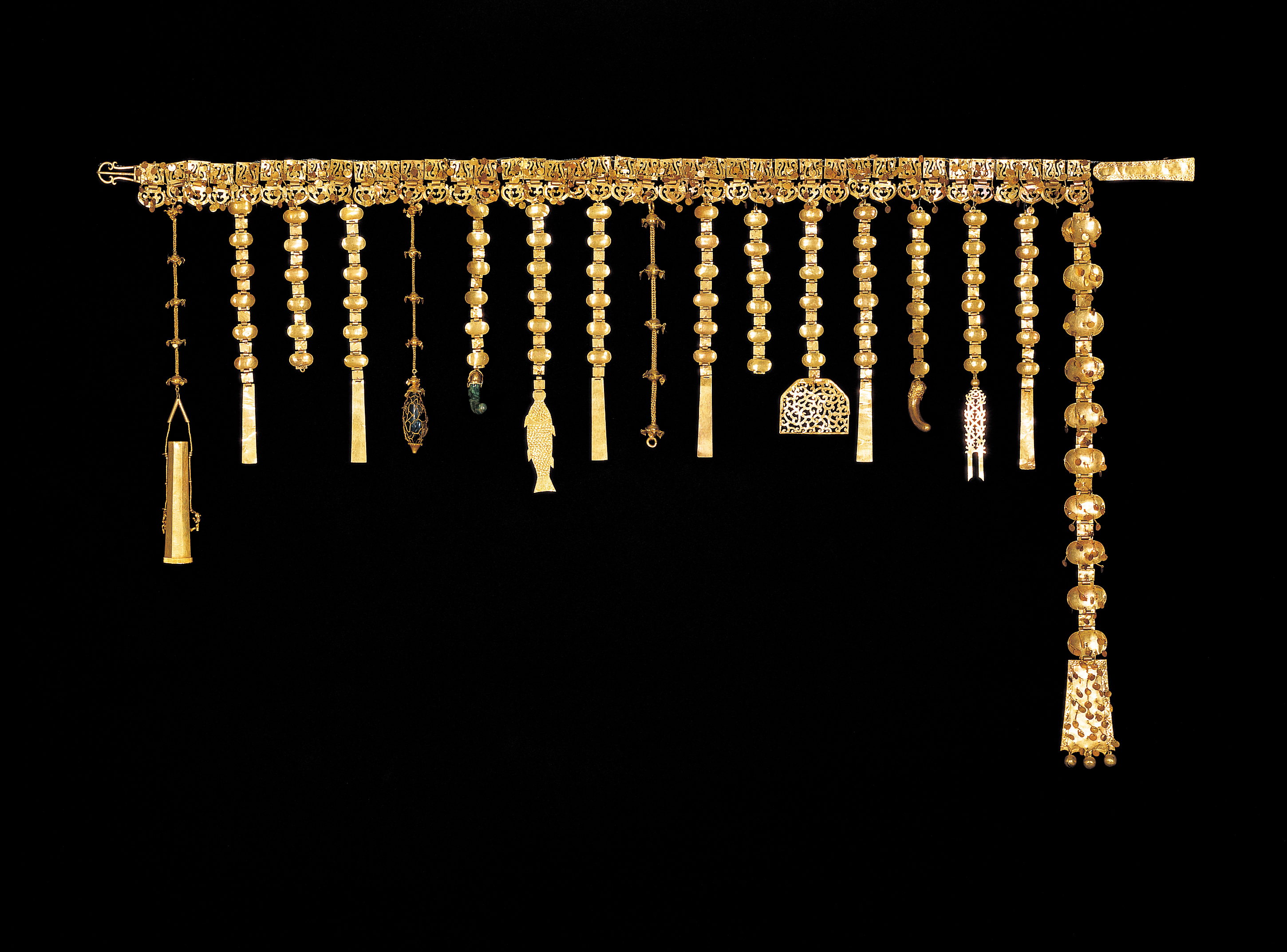
Belt made in Silla era with gold. National Treasure of Korea No. 88

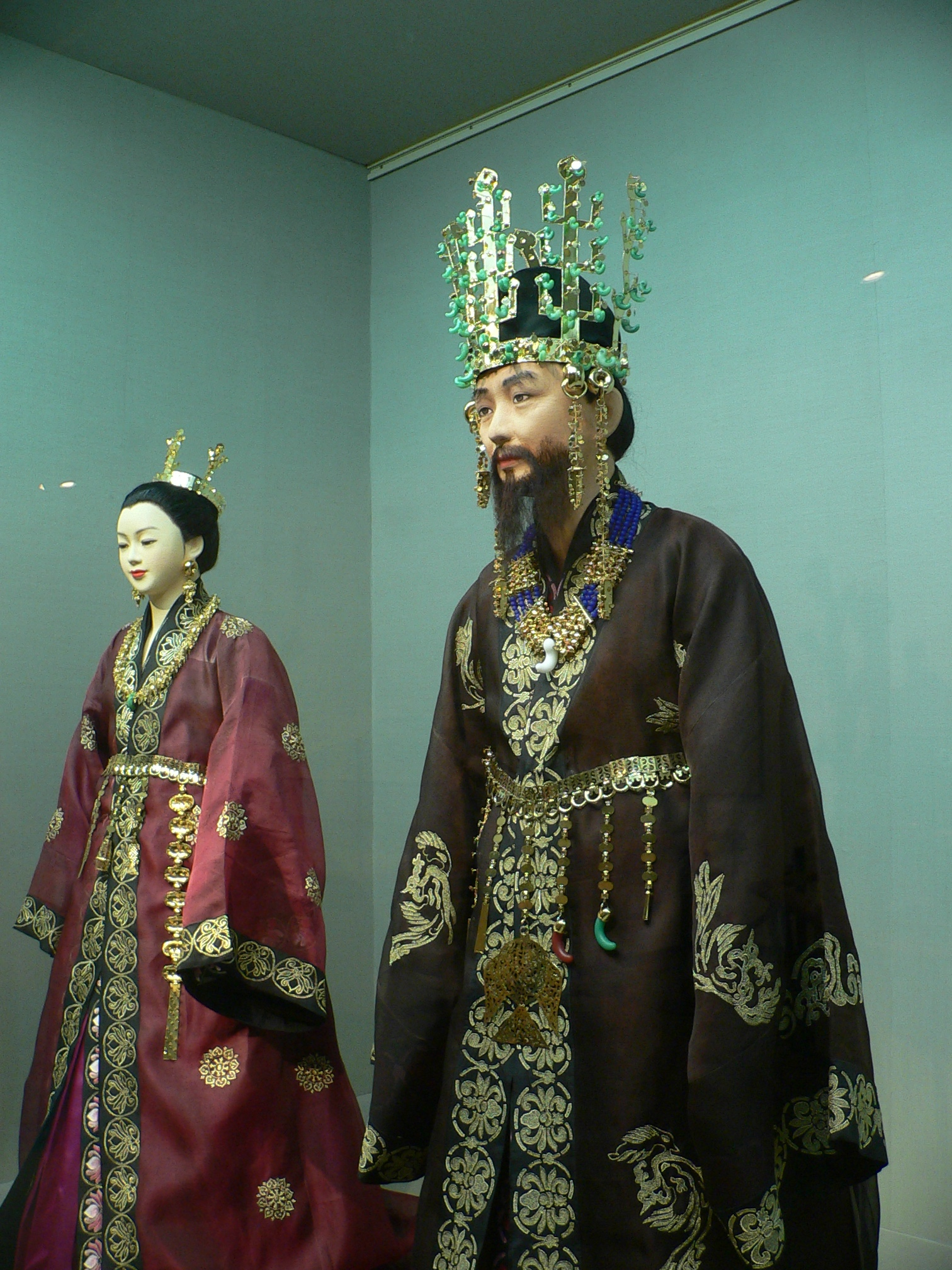
Both the king and queen are wearing gold girdles. The queen's belt prominently displays the oval chain of yopae. The king's girdle contains charms of gogok and other ornaments.

== National Treasure No. 88 ==
Geumgwanchong gwadae mit yopae (hangul 금제과대 hanja 金製銙帶) (Girdle and pendants from Geumgwanchong) was designated as the 88th national treasure of Korea on December 20, 1962. This girdle was found in the Gold Crown Tomb and originates from the Silla kingdom. It is currently housed at the Gyeongju National Museum.

== National Treasure No. 190 ==
Cheonmachong geumje gwadae (hangul 천마총금제과대 hanja 天馬塚金製銙帶) (Gold girdle with pendants from Cheonmachong) was excavated from the Heavenly Horse Tomb and was designated as the 190th national treasure of Korea on December 7, 1978. This girdle is also housed at the Gyengju National Museum and is of Silla provenance.

This golden belt is 125 centimetres in length and is made from 44 metal rectangles. Leather or metal rings were inserted to link the belt through nine holes in the girdle. Hanging from the girdle are numerous charms, the symbolic meaning of these charms are still in question. However, the charms may originate from Chinese traditions of formality from the book Yegi. The charms on the left of the belt include jade comma-shaped gogok, a small knife, a case for medicines, a whetstone, a flint, and tweezers. These charms match the objects needed to perform the ancestral rites based on Chinese tradition. The charms hanging on the right side of the belt include bone instruments worn on the thumb for use in archery, an instrument used to suspend the bowstring, and a cup.

Also attached to the girdle is the Yopae which is 22.5 to 73.5 centimetres in length. This ornament is a chain of thirteen oval-like and quadrangle-like gold plates.

Both the girdle itself and the Yopae were found worn on the waist of the person interred in the Heavenly Horse Tomb.

== National Treasure No.192 ==
Geumjegwadae (hangul 금제과대 hanja 金製銙帶) (Gold girdle with pendants from the north mound of Tumulus No.98) was designated on December 7, 1978, as the 192nd national treasure of Korea.

This belt is 120 centimeters in length and is made of pure gold. It consists of 28 metal rectangles interlinked together. Like National Treasure No.190, this belt holds a number of charms on its left side including comma-shaped jadeite beads, a knife, a case for drugs, a whetstone, a flint, and tweezers. These items were described in the Yegi (a book on the lessons of formality) as the tools required for honoring the ancestors. The right side of the belt holds a bone instrument worn on the thumb for use in archery, a tool used to suspend bowstrings in archery, and a cup.

The girdle was also found with the Yopae, a gold chain of 13 oval and rectangular metal plates that were attached to the main belt of the girdle via a hinge. It is about 22.5 to 73.5 centimeters in length. The Yopae is important because it gives clues as to how the girdle was worn and used.

Tomb No.98, also known as Hwangnamdaechong, is part of the ancient tomb complex of Michuwangneung District and is the largest tomb made during the Silla dynasty. (King Michu's tomb, Silla Dynasty). The tomb is dated to be before Silla unified Korea in 688 CE. It has been excavated twice, once in 1973 and once in 1975, and is 80 meters in diameter measured from east to west and 120 meters in diameter from north to south. The tomb is a double mound and is shaped like a gourd. The south entrance is 23 meters in height and the north entrance is 22 meters in height. There is significant controversy over the identity of the people buried in the north and south tomb. The golden girdle found in this tomb may have been for a Silla queen because there was a plaque found in the tomb which indicated that the belt was for a woman. However, no Silla queen was recorded that matches the date of the tomb so there is still debate over who and what gender was buried in the north mound and south mound.

== Treasure No.629 ==
Geumjegwadaemityopae (hangul 금제과대요패 hanja 金製銙帶腰佩) (Gold girdle with pendants from the south mound of Tumulus No.98) is a lesser gold belt found in the South mound of Tomb No.98. It is housed at the Gyeongju National Museum and is of Silla manufacture.

This belt is 99 centimetres in total length. The short waist plate is 18 to 22 centimetres in length, while the long waist plate measures at 79.5 centimetres in length. The belt, like other Korean girdles, is made up of square plates. This belt has engravings on the belt and also has 34 leaf-like ornaments. This girdle only holds seven charms. Six dangle close to the belt while one charm hangs lower, the Yopae. The shorter charms include a symbol of a fish and three comma-shaped beads (gogok). This belt also has clasps on both ends which is a distinguishing feature from other gold girdles. The belt is less grand than its counterpart in the north mound of Tomb No.98 and was probably not worn by a king or queen of Silla.

== See also ==
- National treasures of Korea
- National treasures of North Korea
- Crown of Silla
- Crown of Baekje
