= Cheonmachong =

Tomb in Gyeongju, South Korea

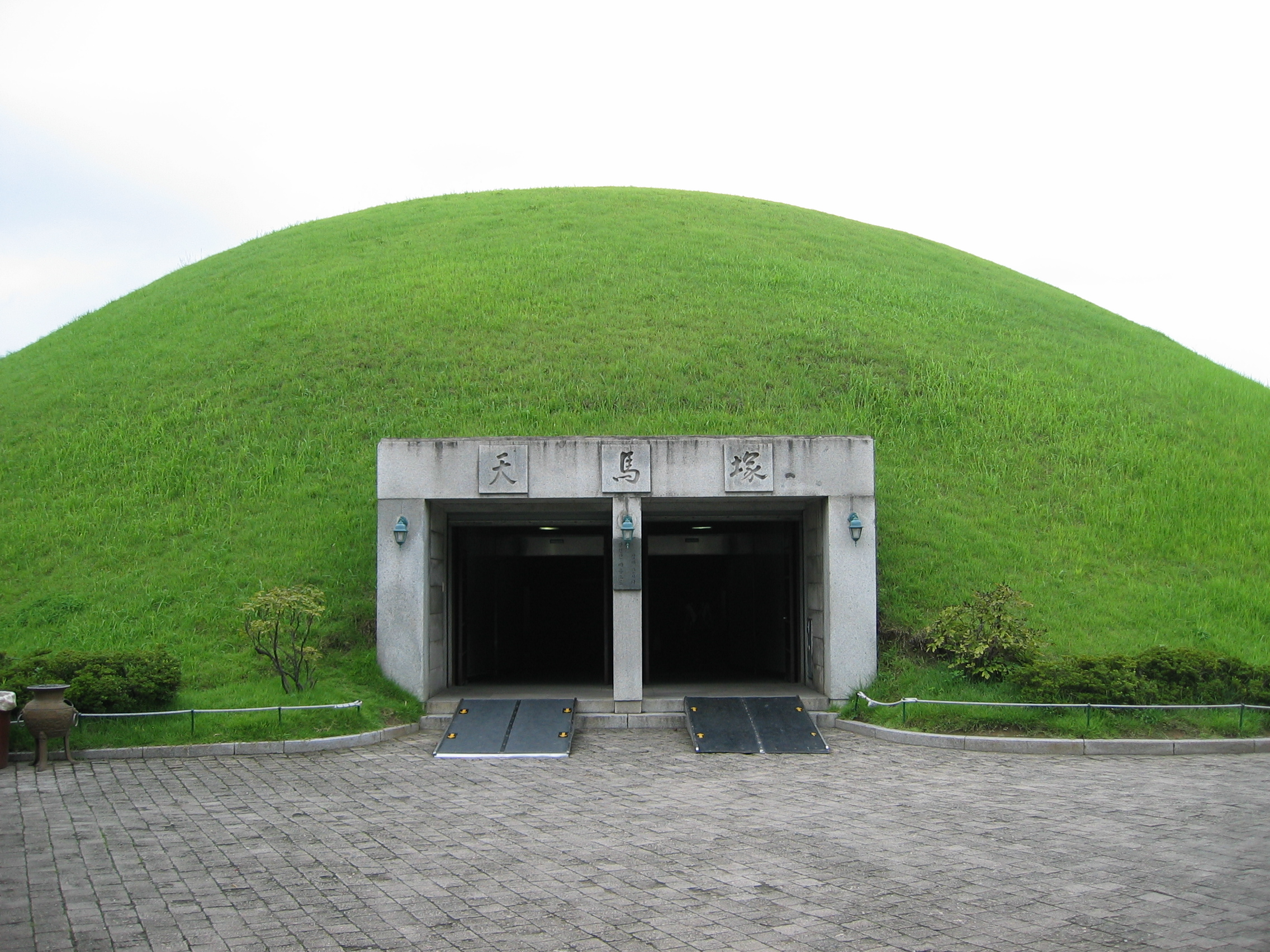
- The entrance (2007)
- Interactive map of Cheonmachong
- 35°50′16″N 129°12′45″E

UNESCO World Heritage Site
- Designated: 2000
- Part of: Gyeongju Historic Areas
- Reference no.: 976

Korean name
- Hangul: 천마총
- Hanja: 天馬塚
- RR: Cheonmachong
- MR: Ch'ŏnmach'ong

Cheonmachong (Korean: 천마총; lit. 'sky horse tomb'), formerly Tomb No. 155, is a tumulus located in Gyeongju, South Korea. It is located inside the tomb complex Daereungwon.

== History ==
This tomb was built in the style of Silla. Excavation of the tomb began on April 16, 1973 and is believed to date probably from the fifth century but perhaps from the sixth century CE. The tomb was for an unknown king of the Silla Kingdom. There is a strong view that this tomb is the tomb of King Jijeung. The deceased is estimated to be around 5 feet 3 inches (160 cm) tall.

== Architecture ==
The tomb, in typical Silla style, is a wood-lined chamber running east to west and is covered in a mound of boulders and earth. This kind of tomb is said to follow the pattern of a Scytho-Iranian tomb in Pazyryk, Russia. The tomb is 47 metres in diameter, 157 metres in circumference, and 12.7 metres in height.

=== Chamber ===
The chamber of the tomb contained a lacquered wooden coffin which had burial goods placed around it. A total of 11,500 artifacts were recovered from the tomb. The name of the tomb derives from a famous painting of a white horse which is depicted on a birch bark saddle flap, also referred to as a mud-guard. The horse, a Cheonma (Korean Flying horse), has eight legs and is depicted with wings on its feet. This painting is a rare example of extant Silla painting and indicates a strong influence by the Korean Goguryeo Kingdom. The burial of horse trappings and the sacrifice of a horse with the king shows the importance of horse culture in Silla society and indicates the central role of the king in shamanism practiced by the people. The other side of the saddle flaps depict horsemen and the phoenix. The tomb also yielded many other treasures including a gold crown and a gold girdle, both replete with jade comma-shaped beads. These trappings of royalty indicate that a king was buried in the tomb. Additionally, the fact that the girdle in the Heavenly Horse Tomb is similar to a girdle found in the Gold Crown Tomb and the use of the dragon motif in gold plates which matches treasures in the Baekje King Muryeong also indicate a royal king was interred in the tomb. Besides the crown and girdle, the chamber also held gold bracelets and gold rings for every finger of the buried king. The tomb also contained a chest full of burial goods which including the aforementioned painted saddle flap, and also iron kettles, pottery, bronze vessels, lacquerware, saddles, and a 98 centimeter long sword.

=== Crown ===
The Gold Crown from Cheonmachong Tomb is considered one of the most valuable gold crowns in Silla. It features a large cluster with three branch shaped ornaments and two deer horn shaped ornaments, and it is full of jade and spangles. The crown and cap was made by combining four gold plates decorated with bore patterns. It is believed to have been placed on top of a hat made of birch bark. Various types of patterns were precisely drilled into it to make it beautiful, including the T-charge pattern, the diamond-shaped pattern, and the twisted dragon pattern.

== Gallery ==
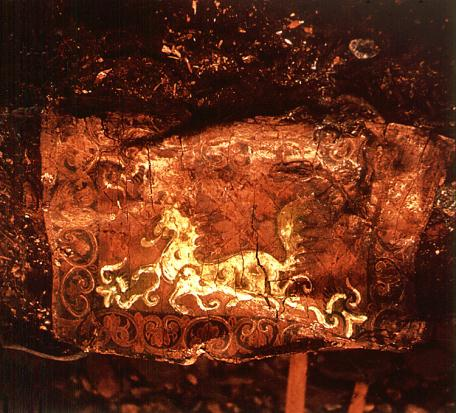
Cheonmado (Painting of the Heavenly Horse), National Treasure No. 207

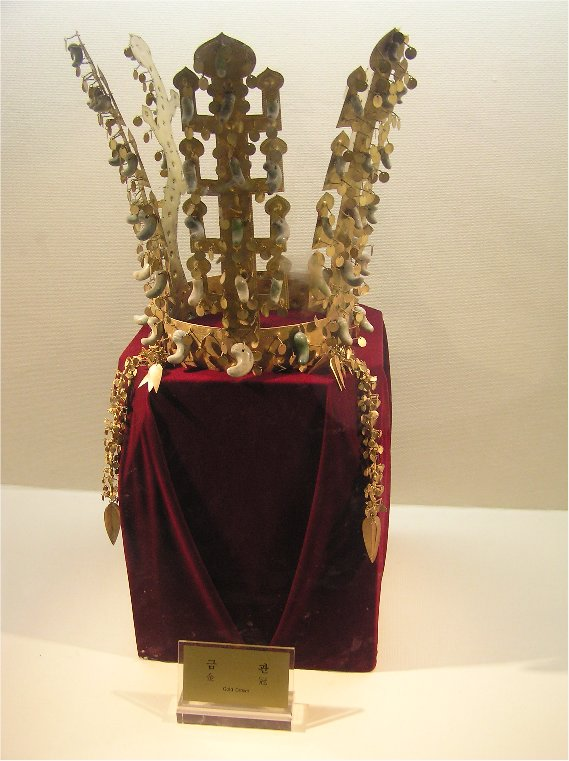
Gold crown of Silla, National Treasure No. 188

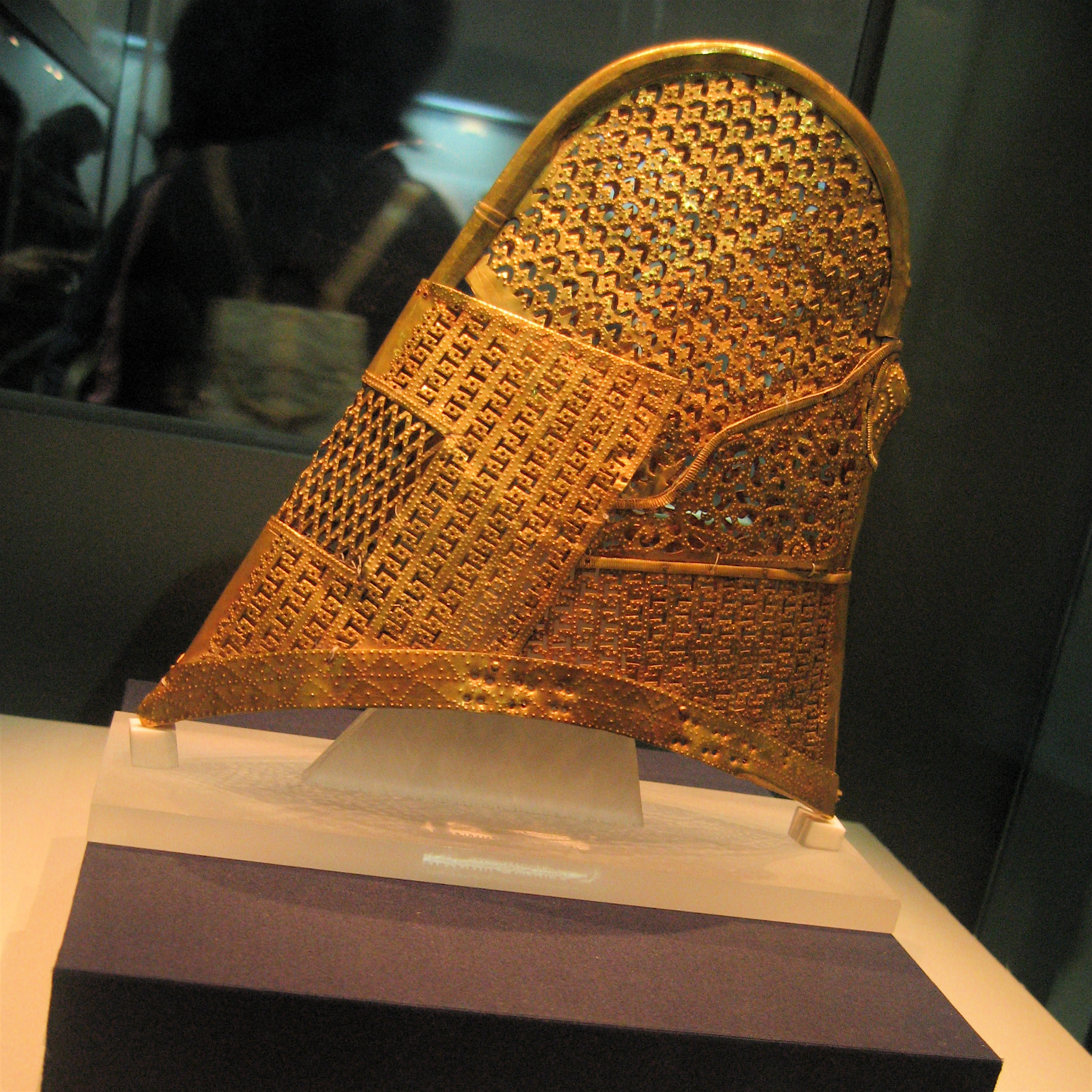
Gold hat. National Treasure No. 189

== See also ==
- History of Korea
- Silla
- Korean art
- Crown of Silla
- Gold girdle of Korea
