= Maitreya (disambiguation) =

Maitreya is the future Buddha in Buddhist eschatology.

Maitreya may also refer to:

- Maitreya (Mahābhārata), a sage in the Indian epic Mahabharata
- Maitreya (Share International), an organization that has stated Maitreya has been living in London, England since the 1970s
- Maitreya (Theosophy), a member of the Theosophical "Masters of the Ancient Wisdom"
- Maitreya-nātha, the reputed co-author of a number of Yogacara Buddhist treatises
- Maitreya Great Tao, a Yiguandao splinter sect founded by Wang Hao-te
- Maitreya teachings, a set of beliefs that developed in China as early as the 6th century CE
- Maitreya Upanishad, one of the minor scriptures of Hinduism
- Akshay Kumar Maitreya, Indian historian and social worker
- Arya Maitreya Mandala, a Tibetan Buddhism Order founded by Anagarika Govinda
- Balangoda Ananda Maitreya Thero, a Sri Lankan monk and scholar
- Buddha Maitreya (sculpture), a Chinese statue from the 5th century CE
- Sananda Maitreya (fka Terence Trent D'Arby), an American singer-songwriter

== See also ==
- Maitreyi (disambiguation)
- Maitreya Festival, electronic dance music festival with an alternative-lifestyle focus, held annually in Australia since 2008
- Maitreya Project, international organization originally set up to construct a 500ft-high statue of Maitreya Buddha
- Gilt-bronze Maitreya in Meditation (disambiguation), Buddhist sculptures designated Korean National Treasures
- Maha Vihara Maitreya, one of the largest Buddhist temples in Indonesia
- Paradise of Maitreya, dry fresco painting by Zhu Haogu, created during the Yuan Dynasty
- Benjamin Creme, Scottish author who promoted an interpretation of Maitreya
