= Gold crown =

Gold crown may refer to:

- Crown (British coin)
- Écu d'or, a French coin often called a "crown" in English sources
- Geumgwan (Korean: 금관; Hanja: 金冠), royal gold crowns of Gaya and Silla
- Gold Crown Tomb (Geumgwanchong), a Silla tumulus in modern-day Gyeongju, South Korea
- Gold Crown of Merit
- Gold crown, a type of crown in dentistry
