= Crown of Gaya =

Ancient Korean archaeological artifacts

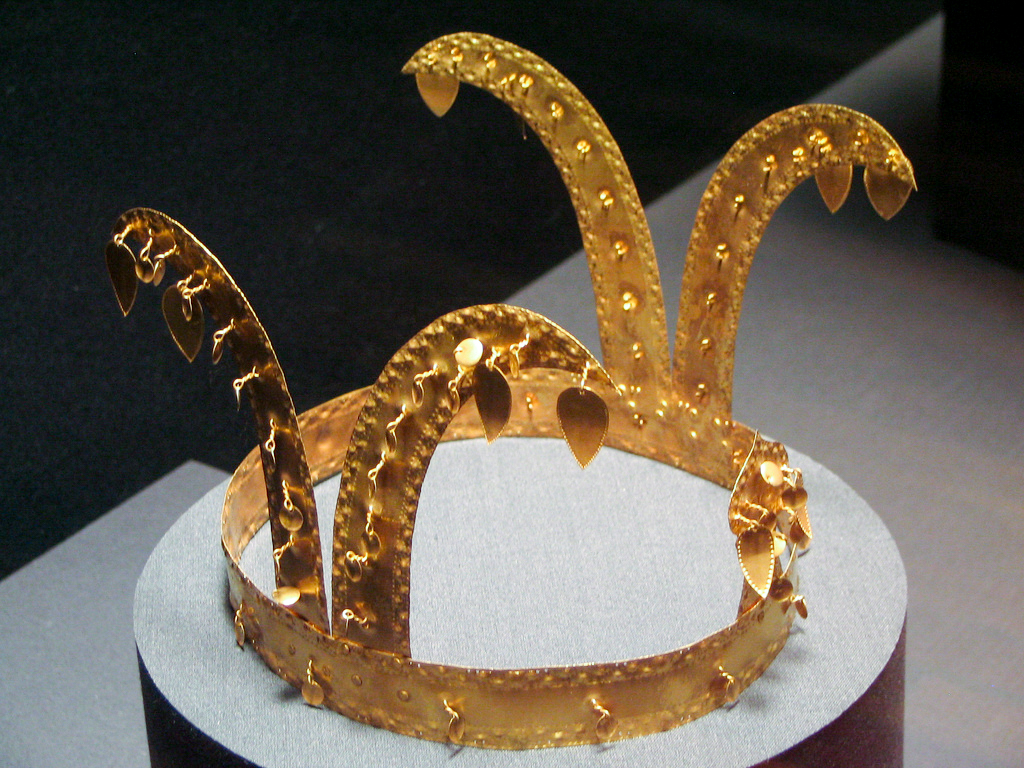
- A Gaya crown on display at the National Museum of Korea.

Korean name
- Hangul: 금관및부속금구
- Hanja: 金冠및附屬金具
- Revised Romanization: Geumgwan mit Busok Geumgu
- McCune–Reischauer: Kŭmgwan mit Pusok Kŭmgu

The crowns of Gaya refers to two excavated pieces that are believed to be the headgear of the elite of the Gaya Confederacy. These crowns share the general traditions of Korean crowns, such as the use of diadems, which follows the tradition of the Baekje and the use of headbands with uprights, most notably used in the crowns of Silla. However, the Gaya crowns are obviously distinctive from the traditions of the Silla and Baekje and shows that the Gaya people enjoyed an independent culture.

== National Treasure No.138 ==
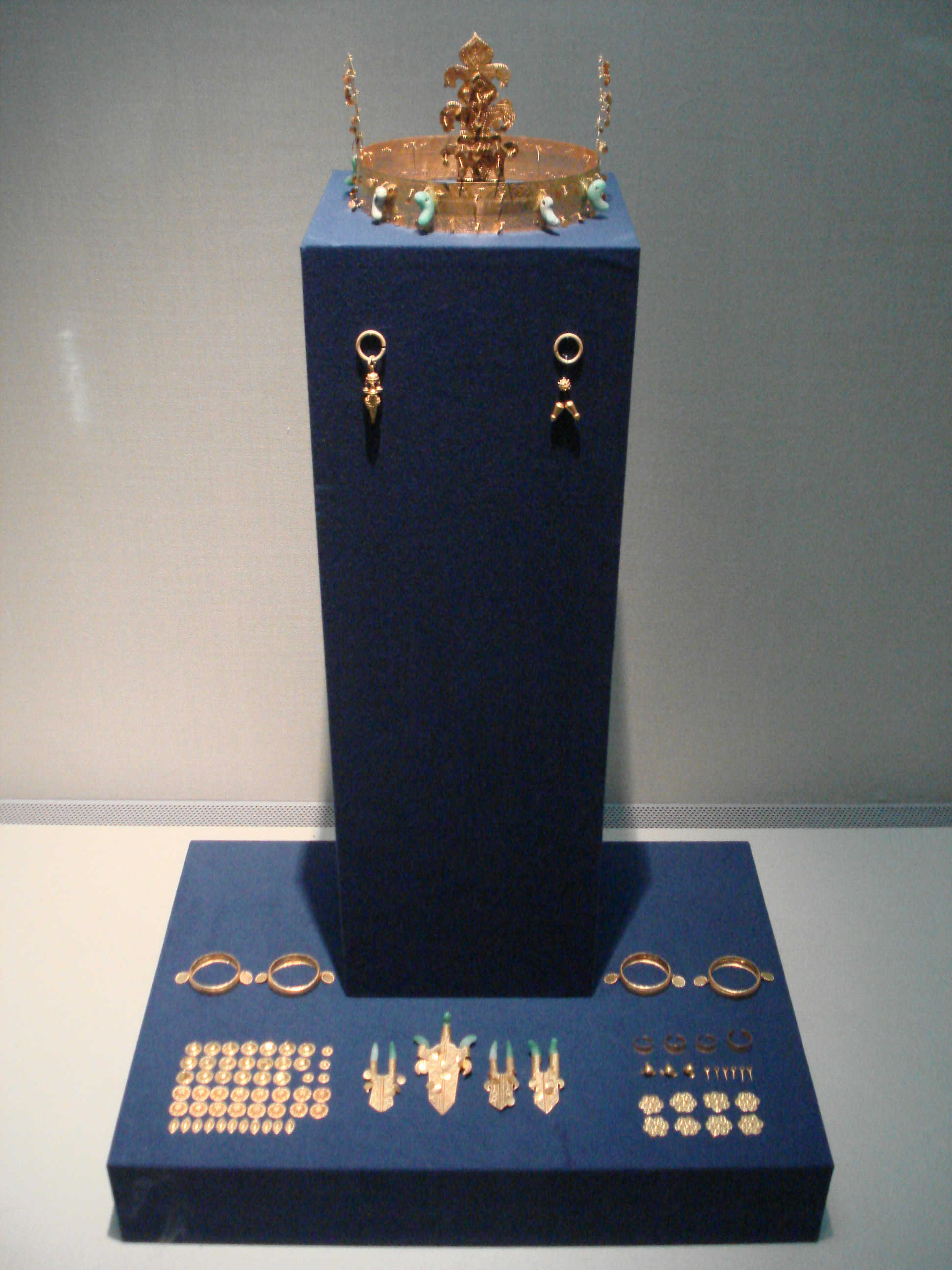
Gold crown and accessories. National Treasure No.138.

The Geumgwan mit busok geumgu refers to a collection of artifacts including a gold crown and its accompanying accessories, finger rings, and earrings. The crown is currently housed at the Hoam Art Museum. This artifact, along with its accompanying accessories, was designated as a national treasure of Korea on December 21, 1971. The crown is believed to be from the fifth or sixth century CE and the crown measures 11.5 centimetres (4 1/2 inches) in height, 3.6 centimetres (1 1/2 inches) in width, and 20.7 centimetres (8 1/6 inches) in diameter.

The crown has three distinctive parts. The headband is made of gold. It is decorated with tiny gold mirrors which are attached to the band. The band itself is incised with dotted decorations running on the top and bottom in a diamond motif. Attached to the band are jade gogok. However, whether these beads were supposed to be on the headband is still debated because they were apparently not found on the crown when it was excavated.

The appendages of the crown are placed equidistant from each other on the circular headband. These appendages look similar to fleur de lis symbol but are more often described as grass-shaped or floral-shaped. Each appendage is identical and has three sets of prongs flowing downward at a right angle and is topped with a jewel-shaped finial. These appendages resemble a crown of Baekje which also had flowing floral-like patterns instead of the stylistic crowns of Silla.

Finally, the crown came with four floral-shaped ornaments which were probably used as diadems. Jade gogok were attached to the gold ornaments as well as tiny gold disks. It is believed that these ornaments follow Silla styles and are also incised with dots in a diamond motif like the headband of the crown.

== See also ==
- National treasures of Korea
- Gaya Confederacy
- Crown of Silla
- Crown of Baekje
