= Daereungwon =

Tomb complex in Gyeongju, South Korea

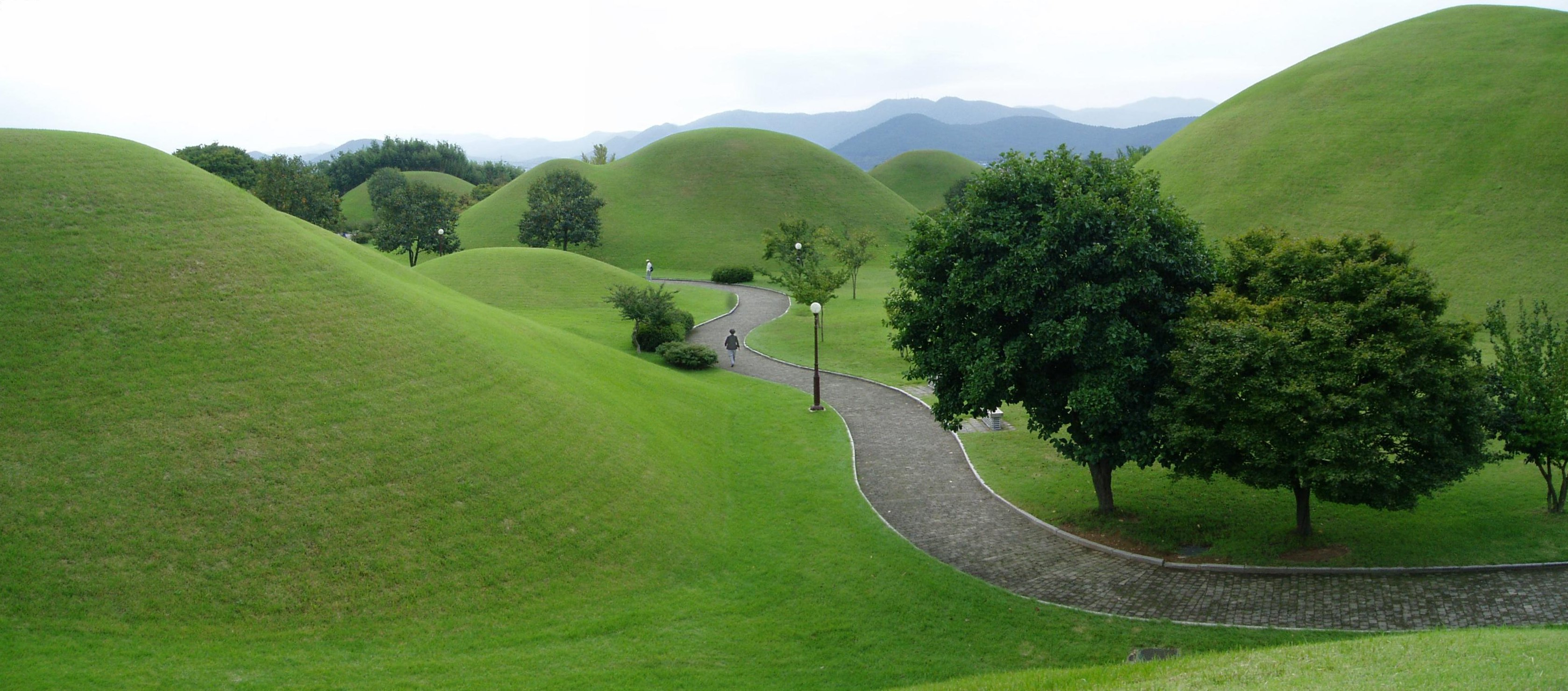
- Part of the complex (2007)
- Interactive map of Daereungwon
- Location: Gyeongju, South Korea
- Coordinates: 35.838°N 129.212°E

UNESCO World Heritage Site
- Criteria: Cultural: (ii), (iii)
- Designated: 2000
- Part of: Gyeongju Historic Areas
- Reference no.: 976

Historic Sites of South Korea
- Official name: Daereungwon Ancient Tomb Complex, Gyeongju
- Designated: 28 July 2011

Korean name
- Hangul: 대릉원
- Hanja: 大陵園
- RR: Daereungwon
- MR: Taerŭngwŏn

Daereungwon (Korean: 대릉원; Hanja: 大陵園) is a complex of Silla-era tumulus tombs in Gyeongju, South Korea. Since 2011, it has been a designated Historic Site. Daereungwon is a popular tourist attraction. In 2023, it was reported that it received around one million visitors on average per year.

== Description ==
The complex contains 23 tombs of kings, queens, and nobles from the Silla period of Korean history. The tombs were first excavated during the 1910–1945 Japanese colonial period: Geumgwanchong in 1921, Geumnyeongchong and Singnichong in 1924, and Seobongchong in 1926. After the 1945 liberation of Korea, Houchong was excavated in 1946, Machong in 1953, Ssangsangchong in 1963, and Cheonmachong in 1973.

Most tombs hold a coffin below ground level, while others are found partly or wholly above ground. Stones, and then earth, were piled on top of the coffins. The sturdy construction of the tombs made them difficult for looters to access, which allowed for many relics to remain well-preserved until their rediscovery in the present era. A number of relics have been designated National Treasures. Artifacts have continued to be excavated. In 2020, a pair of ceremonial gilt-bronze shoes, dated to the late 5th and early 6th centuries, was discovered in the complex.

Daereungwon is a popular tourist attraction. In 2023, it was reported that it received around one million visitors on average per year.

== Gallery ==
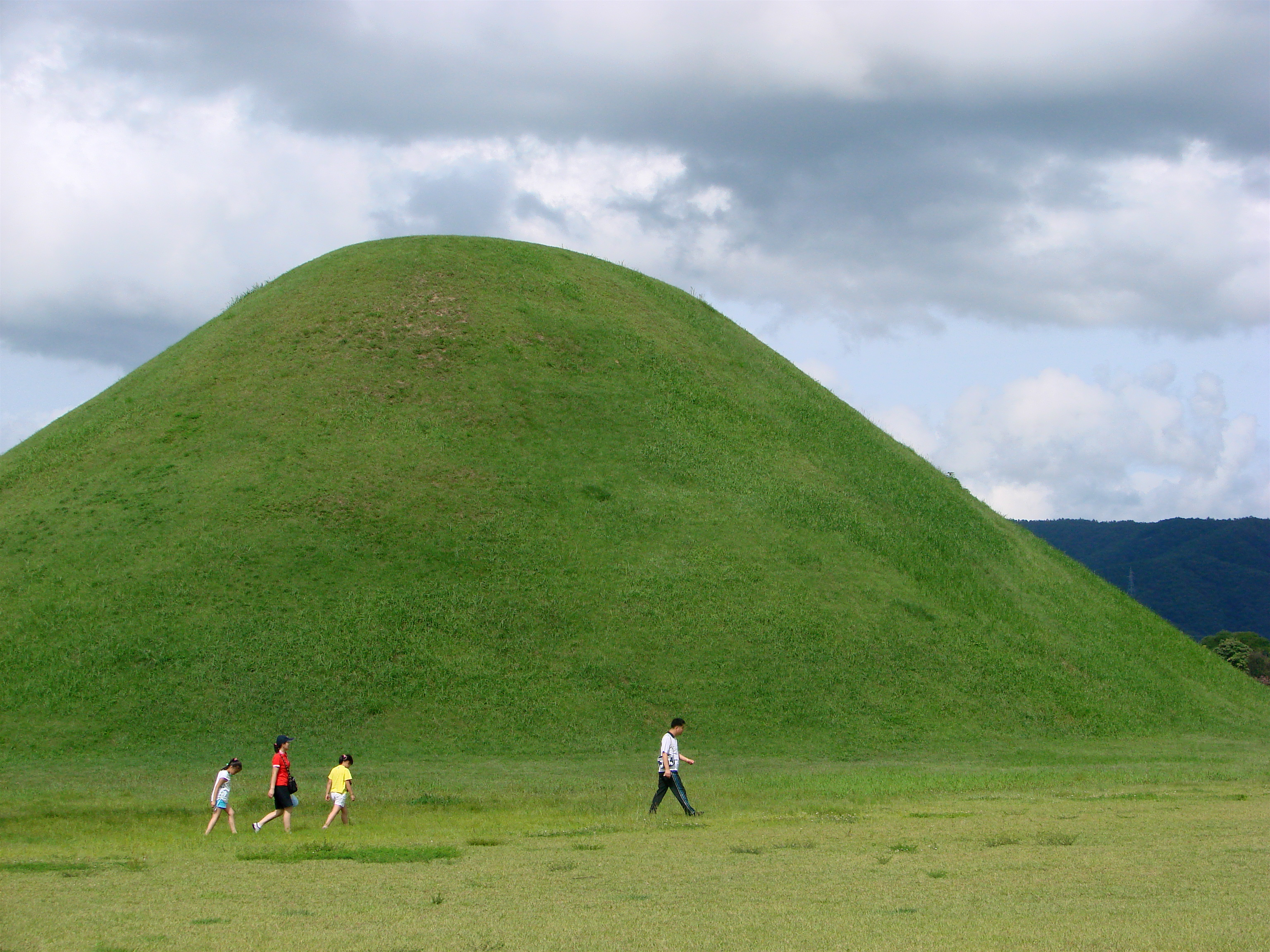
People walking near one of the tombs (2006)

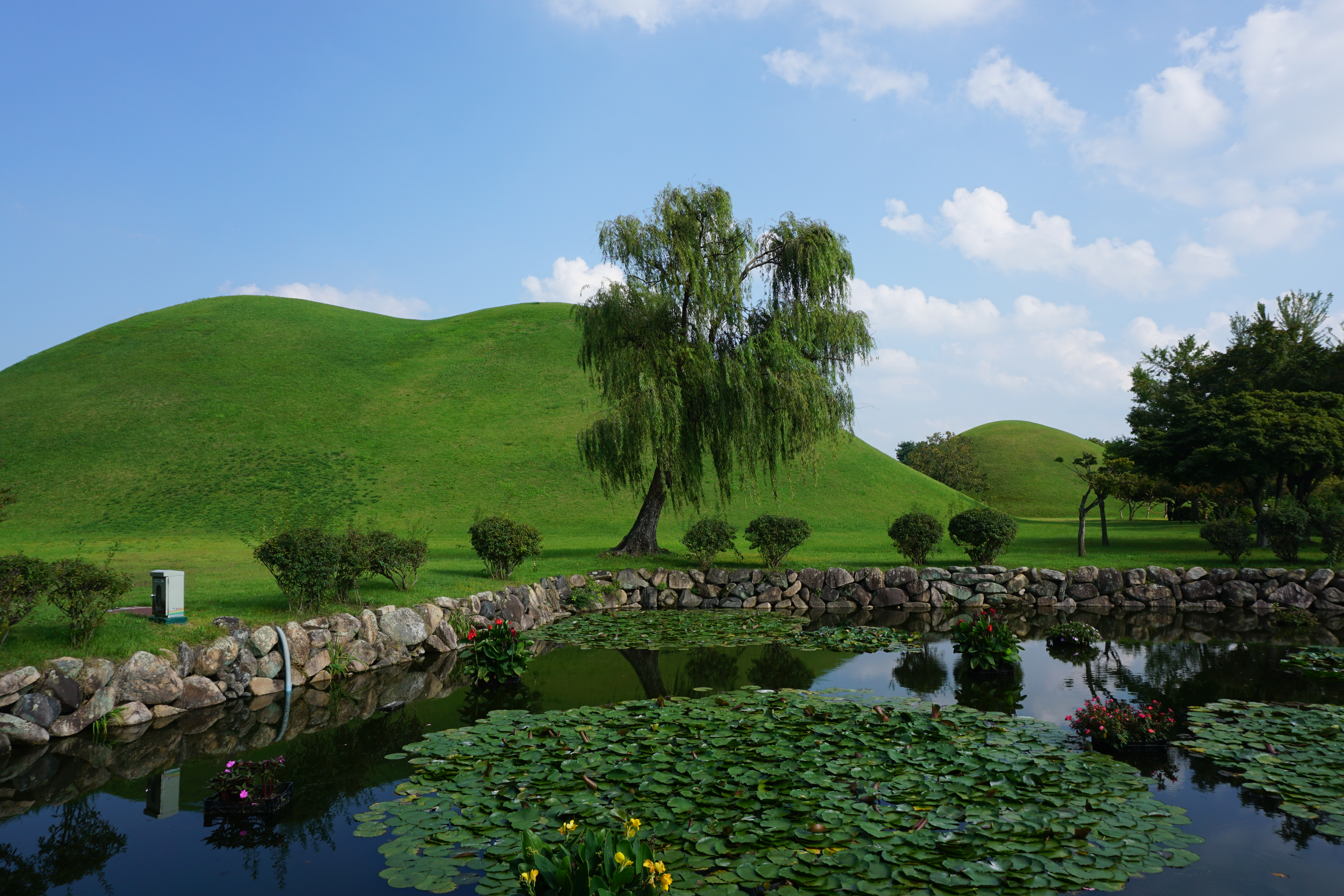
A lake within the complex (2019)
