= Maitreyi (disambiguation) =

Maitreyi may refer to:

- Maitreyi, an ancient Indian philosopher
- Maitreyi Devi, an Indian writer in Bengali
  - Bengal Nights or Maitreyi, a novel by Mircea Eliade exploring his relationship with Devi
- Maitreyi Pushpa, an Indian writer in Hindi
- Maitreyi College, a women's college in New Delhi
- Maitreyi Ramakrishnan, a Canadian actress

== See also ==
- Maitreya (disambiguation)
- Maitri (disambiguation)
- Mythri (disambiguation)
- Maitrayaniya Upanishad, a Hindu scripture
