= Gold Crown from Cheonmachong =

Crown of Silla

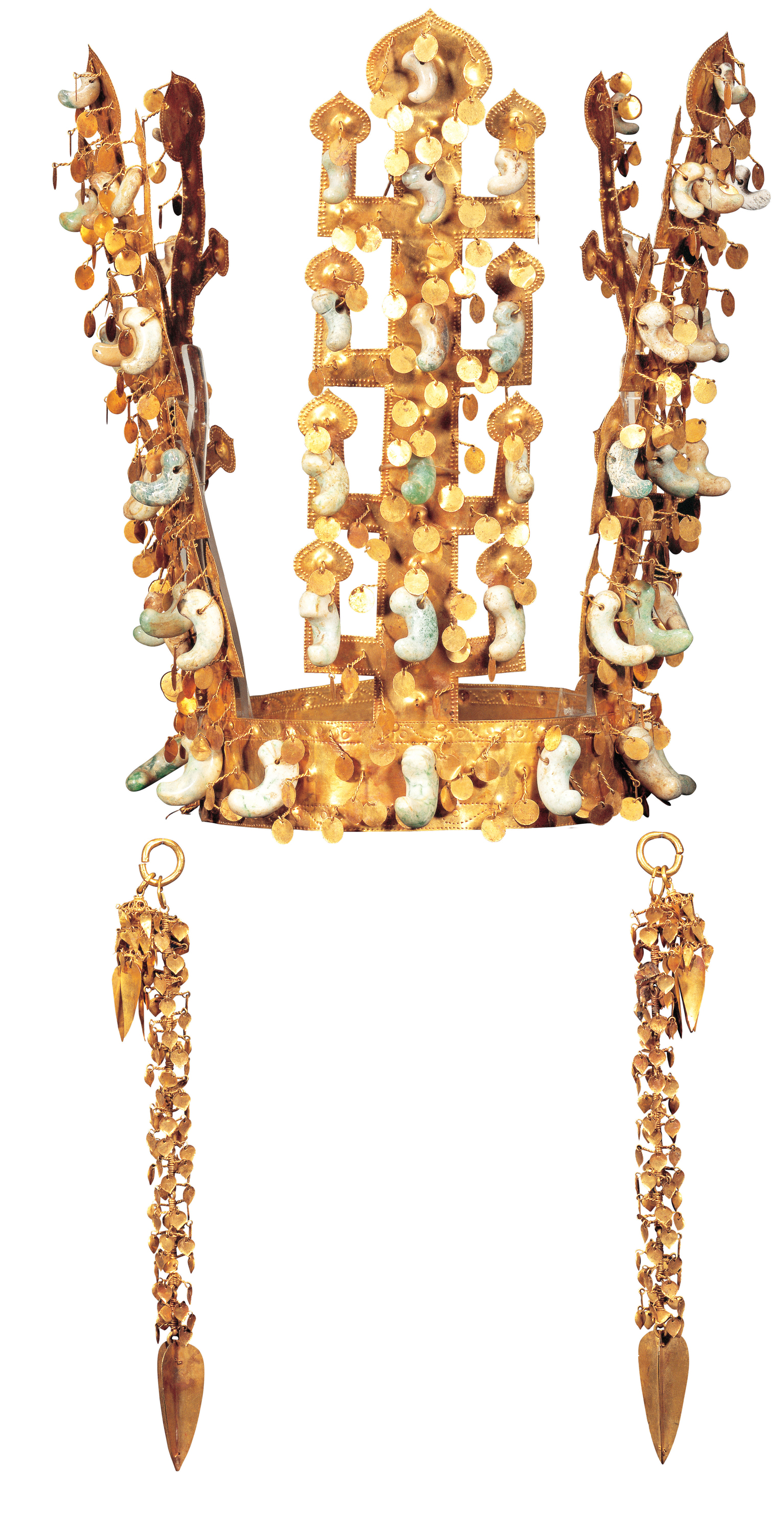
- Gold crown from Cheonmachong tomb
- Location: Gyeongju National Museum
- Coordinates: 35°49′46″N 129°13′41″E

National Treasure (South Korea)
- Designated: December 7, 1978
- Reference no.: 188

Korean name
- Hangul: 천마총 금관
- Hanja: 天馬塚 金冠
- RR: Cheonmachong geumgwan
- MR: Ch'ŏnmach'ong kŭmgwan

The Gold Crown from Cheonmachong (Korean: 천마총 금관; Hanja: 天馬塚 金冠) is a crown from the Silla dynasty. It was discovered in Cheonmachong tomb in Gyeongju, North Gyeongsang Province, South Korea, in 1973. Considered the largest and most elaborate surviving ancient Korean crown, it was designated a National Treasure of South Korea in 1978.

== Description ==
The 32.5-centimetre (12.8 in) tall and 1.3-kilogram (2.9 lb) crown is made from a gold and silver alloy. The crown itself averages 83.5wt% gold and 16.3wt% silver; the metal pendants have a higher proportion of gold. There are 382 of these pendants, as well as 58 jade ornaments. The front of the crown has three columns with 山-shapes, while the back has two antler-shaped columns. From the bottom hang two strands of leaf-shaped pendants. Each front column consists of four rows of 山-shapes with tips shaped like flower buds, while other discovered crowns have only three rows. The tree and antler shapes represent the connection between earth and heaven while jade symbolizes the beginning of life.

Likely made in the early 6th century, the Cheonmachong crown is the tallest of the surviving ancient Korean crowns and is considered the most elaborate.

== Excavation ==
Cheonmachong was excavated from April 6 to December 4, 1973. During the Silla dynasty, gold was thought to guide the soul on its journey to the underworld. In addition to the gold crown, the owner of Cheonmachong was buried with gold earrings, chest decorations, bracelets, rings, and belts. Alongside other burial objects, the inner crown and other items used for wearing the crown were found outside the coffin. The identity of the owner of the tomb is unclear: some think it is King Jijeung (reign 500–514), while others think it is his younger brother.

The crown was designated a National Treasure on December 7, 1978.

== In modern Korea ==
Ahead of APEC South Korea 2025, the Gyeongju National Museum held an exhibition that gathered six Silla gold crowns for the first time. During the summit, president Lee Jae Myung gifted a replica of the Cheonmachong crown to US president Donald Trump. Kim Taejin, deputy foreign minister for protocol affairs, said the crown symbolized the "opening of the golden age of the Korea-U.S. alliance".

== See also ==
- Crowns of Silla
