= Gilt-bronze Maitreya in Meditation =

Gilt-bronze Maitreya in Meditation may refer to:

- Gilt-bronze Maitreya in Meditation (National Treasure No. 78), a Korean Buddhist sculpture
- Gilt-bronze Maitreya in Meditation (National Treasure No. 83), a Korean Buddhist sculpture
