= Mythri =

Mythri may refer to:

- Mythri Movie Makers, Indian film studio
- Mythri (2012 film), an Indian Telugu-language suspense film
- Mythri (2015 film), an Indian Kannada-language social drama film

== See also ==
- Maitri (disambiguation)
- Maitreyi (disambiguation)
