= Maitri =

Maitrī or Metta is a dharmic philosophy in Indian religions.

Maitri may also refer to:

== Religion ==
- Maitri Upanishad, ancient Hindu text embedded inside the Yajurveda.

== Art and entertainment ==
- Maitri (musician), Dutch heavy metal musician

== Organizations ==
- Maitri Pune, a non-governmental organization in Pune, India

== Science and technology ==
- Maitri (missile), Indian ballistic missile
- Maitri (research station), Indian research station in Antarctica

== See also ==
- Maitreyi (disambiguation)
- Mythri (disambiguation)
- Metta (disambiguation)
