= Gogok =

Korean curved beads

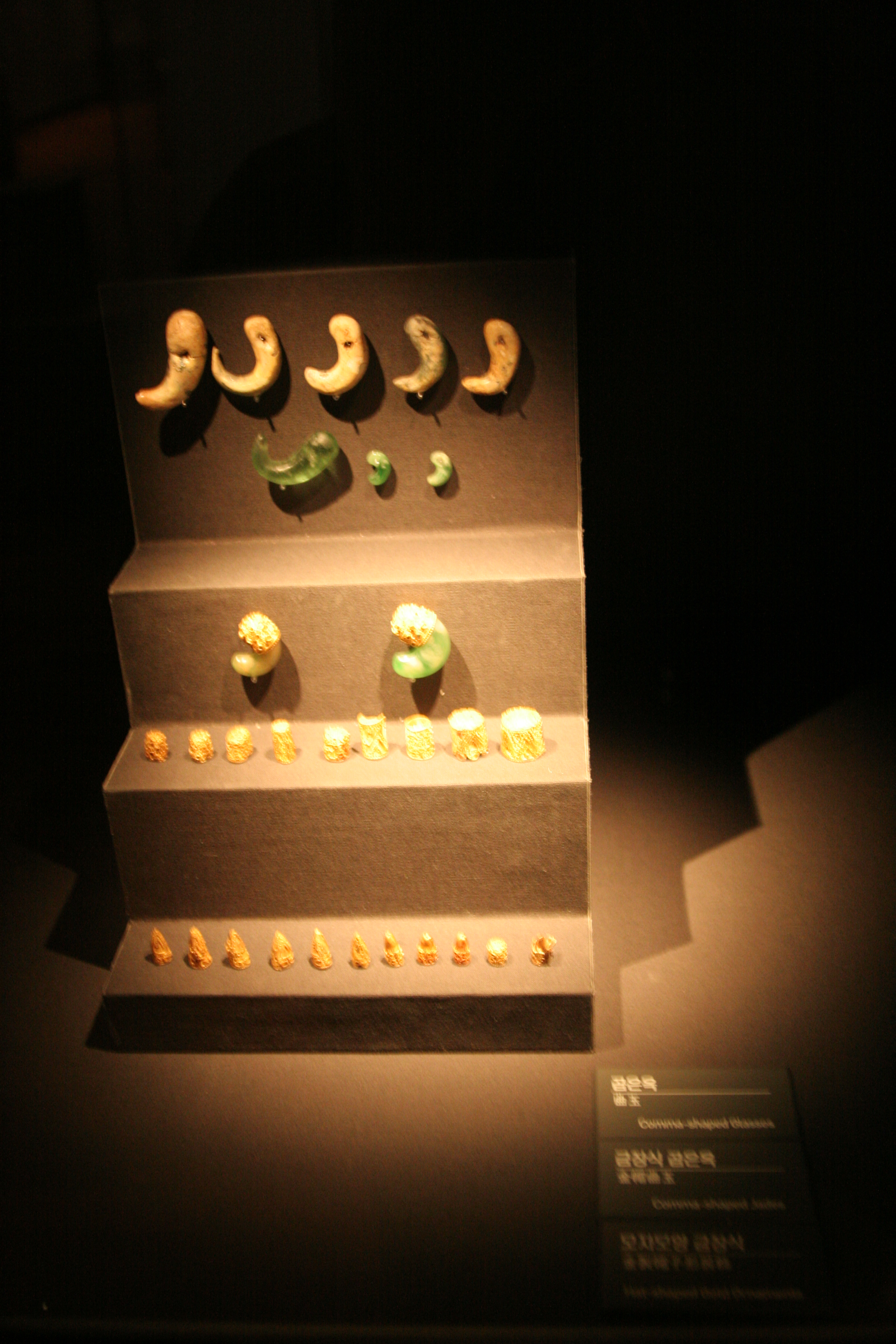
- Glass and jade beads excavated from the Tomb of King Muryeong with of Baekje gold cap ornaments.

Korean name
- Hangul: 곱은옥; 곡옥
- Hanja: 곱은玉; 曲玉
- RR: gobeunok; gogok
- MR: kobŭnok; kogok

Gobeunok or gogok are comma-shaped or curved beads and jewels that appeared from middle age of Mumun Period (850 to 550 BC) through the Three Kingdoms of Korea (57 BC to 668 AD). The Gogok (곡옥; 曲玉) is posited by researchers to have been a symbol of prestige among Mumun culture community leaders as the tombs of presumably powerful figures were oftentimes accompanied by bronze daggers, stone daggers, and comma-shaped jewels. The Gogok's role as a symbol of prestige would carry onto the Three Kingdoms Period of Korea (as Gogok would remain a salient feature of Korean royal paraphernalia (Silla and Baekje). They range in size range from 1 to 10 centimetres (0.39 to 3.94 in), and are oftentimes fashioned with a hole to be attached or threaded to another object. The origin of these comma-shaped jewels are posited by some to originate from the dragon-shaped jadeite ornament of the Hongshan culture (4,500 to 3,000 BC) of the Liao River Basin. However, due to the spatial and temporal distance, most researchers have been skeptical of their genealogical relationship. The generally accepted interpretation in academia is that the form of the comma-shaped jewel originated from the canine teeth of predator animals such as the Magatama of Japan from the late Jōmon period (approximately 1,000 BC) or as a symbol of a half-moon sacred to moon worshippers, or as a symbol of fetus and or fertility.

== History ==
=== Mumun Korea ===
The Gogok jewel is first found on the Korean peninsula during the Middle Mumun Period (850 to 550 BC) in which they have been unearthed from the graves of elites throughout the southern part of the peninsula. The Cist tomb #1 at Songguk-ni—in reference to the Bronze Age rounded pit dwellings of Korea—dated to 800–700 BC has revealed an impressive array of elite grave goods consisting of a lute-shaped bronze dagger and chisel, a polished stone dagger, 11 willow leaf-shaped polished stone arrowheads, 17 tubular beads, and two comma-shaped amazonite stones. These grave goods were typically found in positions where they were originally placed with or worn by the tomb-bearer. For instance, the Cist tomb #1 of the Songguk-ni site had a bronze dagger placed next to the tomb-bearer's left hand. The two comma-shaped ornaments were found on each side of the dagger tip suggested that they had been a decoration element of the now decomposed sheath. The tubular beads were scattered around the dagger between its midpoint and tip. Meanwhile, the stone dagger lay at the waist of the tomb-bearer with its tip pointing towards the feet suggesting that it was attached to the waist of the user. The comma-shaped ornaments were made of amazonite while the tubular bead ere made of jasper and amber while the small circular beads were made of amazonite, crystal or amber. This cist tomb—containing certain jade ornaments (Gogok jewels and tubular beads) and bronze tools—is believed to have belonged to the highest-ranking leaders of this particular Songguk-ni community as its contents align with the general elite paraphernalia of the Middle Mumun Period. Bronze mirrors would be added to this list of elite goods during the Late Mumun Period (550–300 BC).

These comma-shaped amazonite ornaments alongside their tubular and circular bead counterparts have been found in other cist tombs as well as Neolithic and Bronze Age dolmens (Usan-ni in Seungju, Pyeonggeo-dong in Yeosu, Weol'am-ni in Muan, and Daepyeong-ni in Jinju). They have also been found in Middle Mumun residential remains (Jodong-ni in Chungju and Changpyeong-ni in Ulsan). In addition to the widespread excavation of comma-shaped jewels in Mumun sites across southern Korea, between 1995 and 1999, archeologists excavating the Daepyeong-ni Mumun village have discovered several industrial locations where tubular beads of jasper and comma-shaped amazonite ornaments were manufactured. The artifacts unearthed at these production locations consisted of finished and unfinished ornaments, raw materials, and grinding tools. On the basis of site analysis at Daepyeong-ni, Shinya Shoda and his team of researchers have concluded that the production of these prestige jade goods were carried out by the community through two specialized groups located at two different sections within the community to enhance efficiency: the eastern section would provide raw materials and roughly cut stone silhouettes while the western section would create the finished product.

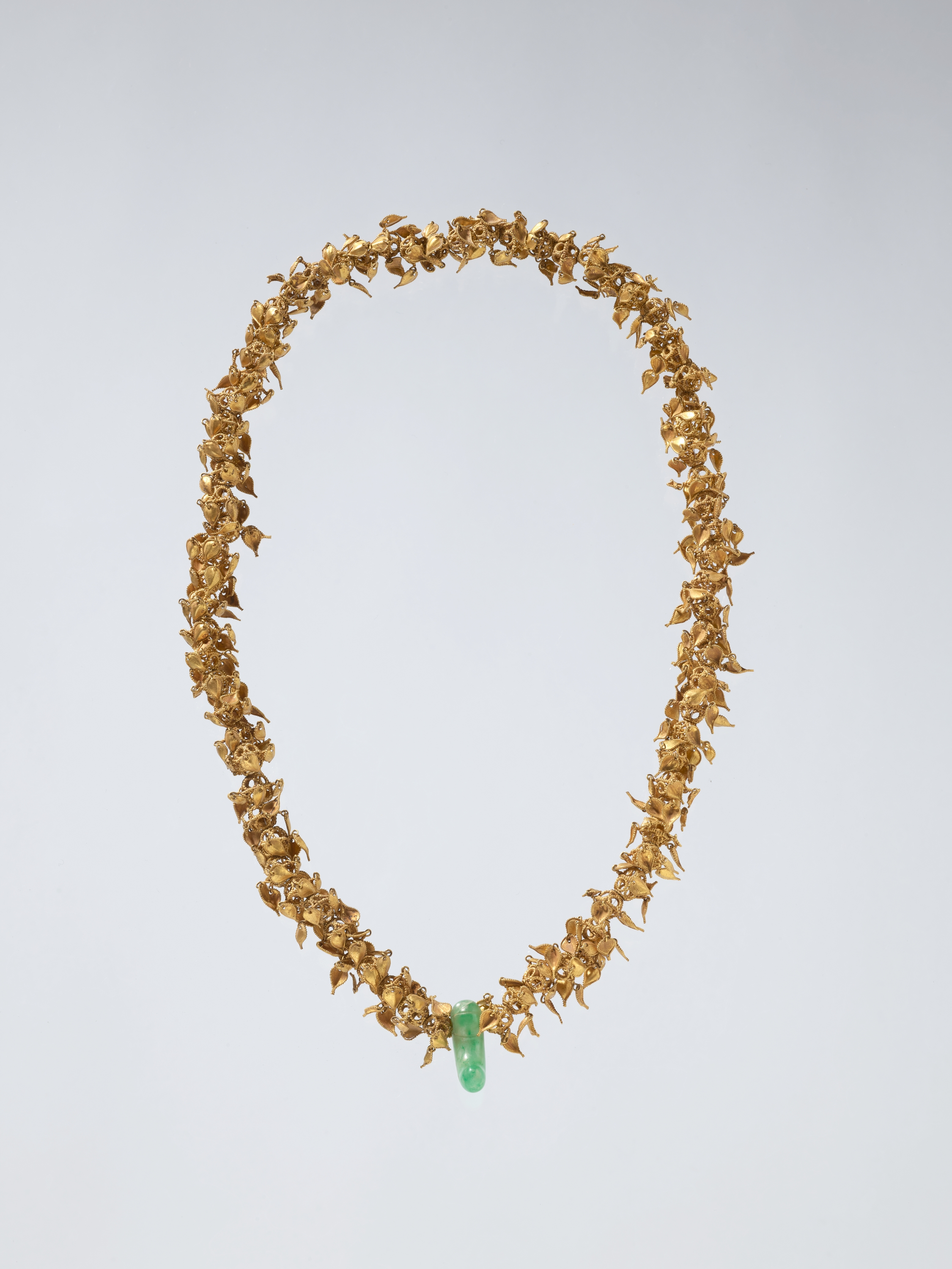
A golden necklace unearthed from Gyeongju of the Korean kingdom of Silla. Jade comma-shaped beads such as these were extensively used by Silla royals and aristocrats to decorate the valuable items they wore, such as gold crowns, necklaces, belts and even garments. That it was an ornament used to further embellish a necklace, made of green jade, and features a form of voluminous crescent with a hole at the head, makes it a fine example of the curved jade beads beloved by the ruling class of Silla.

=== Three Kingdoms Period ===
The Gogok of the Three Kingdoms period were commonly used as earrings and necklaces, and as decoration on crowns, belts, and bracelets. At this time, the material which the ornament was constructed from became increasingly more refined with some even being decorated with gold or silver caps.

The most famous examples of Gogok in Korean art are from the Three Kingdoms period, in the crowns of Silla, earrings, necklaces, and royal girdle of Korea. These treasures were found in the burial mounds and royal mausoleums of Silla, Baekje, and Gaya confederacy. Archaeological evidence suggests that those Gogok were produced in specific areas of Japan as Magatama and were widely dispersed throughout the Japanese archipelago to the Southern Koreanic kingdoms via trade routes.
