= Crown of Baekje =

South Korean national treasure

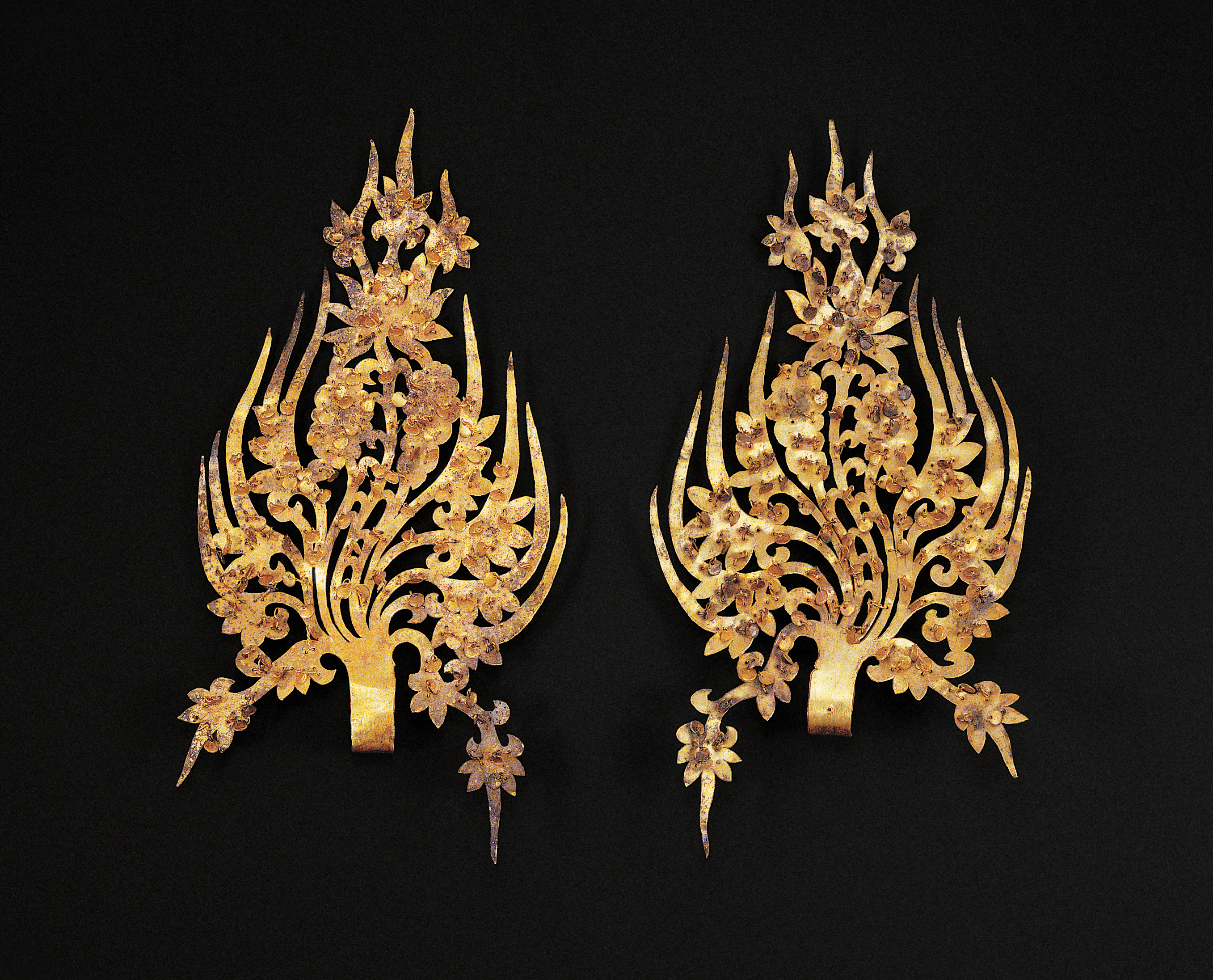

Korean name
- Hangul: 금제관식
- Hanja: 金製冠飾
- Revised Romanization: Geumje Gwansik
- McCune–Reischauer: Kŭmje Kwansik

The Crown of Baekje refers to several artifacts excavated that are believed to be the royal headgear of the kings, queens, and nobility of the Baekje Kingdom. Some of the crowns follow the same tradition as Silla crowns in that they share the tree-motif and the hints of shamanistic traditions. However, the diadems of the kings and queens suggest that Baekje people had a distinct tradition for their royal headgear.

== National Treasure of Korea No.154 ==
The Geumjegwansik are a pair of two gold diadems that were worn by the king of Baekje. Designated on July 9, 1974, they are the 154th national treasure of Korea. The Gongju National Museum currently holds these diadems in their collection. They were excavated from the King Muryeong's tomb in Gongju, South Korea in 1971. The diadems were neatly stacked on top of each other and were found placed near the head of the king in the coffin.

The first of the pair of diadems is 30.7 centimeters tall and 14 centimeters in width, while the second is 29.2 centimeters tall and 13.6 centimeters in width. The diadems were cut from thin plate gold which was only two millimeters in thickness.

At the bottom of both diadems is a ring which is believed to have been used to hook and attach the diadems to a royal cap, presumably made from silk. Based on historical records the king was said to have decorated a gold flower on the back of his black cloth hat. It is believed these diadems would be placed on the left and right or front and back of the royal cap. The diadems would be placed on both sides of the cap and would resemble wings, an important motif in shamanism that probably represented a belief in rebirth.

The whole diadem looks like a mass of vines or branches that are shaped into a flame-like pattern. Flower-like patterns are at the top of the diadem and the lower right and left as well. The flame-like pattern and honeysuckle-arabesque pattern, may have also been derived from Buddhist traditions because of their similarities to the halos of Buddhist sculpture. The diadems are also decorated with many spangles of gold.

The diadem is the first of its kind excavated from a Baekje chamber tomb, because those types of tombs were easily accessible to grave robbers, and gives new insight into Baekje art and the culture of the Baekje royalty.

== National Treasure of Korea No.155 ==
The Geumjegwansik (Gold ornaments for the diadem of the queen) are identical in shape and size and were found in the same tomb as national treasure of Korea No.154, in King Muryeong's tomb. They are the 155th national treasure and were designated on July 9, 1974. The diadems were found in the head of the queen's coffin, placed neatly on top of each other.

They are both 22.6 centimeters in height and 13.4 centimeters in width. These diadems were made by cutting sheet gold. They are ornamented by carving into the gold and the elaborate branch pattern was attached to these plates. Honeysuckle and lotus motifs shape the ornaments and overall shape gives them the impression of a flame. Like the king's ornaments, it is believed that these two diadems were attached to the sides of a royal cap. Unlike the king's diadems, the queen's were not adorned with spangles.

== National Treasure of Korea No.295 ==
The Gilt-bronze Crown from the Sinchon-ri Tumulus (Naju sincholli gobun chuldogeum donggwan) is from the Three Kingdoms of Korea period. It was designated as the 295th national treasure of Korea on September 22, 1997, and is currently housed at the National Museum of Korea. Excavated in 1917–1918, it was found at Sinchon-ri, Naju at the Bannam-myeon excavation.

The crown is about 25.5 centimeters in height. This crown seems to follow in the general tradition of Silla crowns but is notably different as well. The inner crown is a copper cap made from two cylindrical plates. The inner crown is similar to the ones excavated from Ipjeom-ri of Jeollabuk-do Province. The outer crown has three tree-like prongs placed on the outer band but unlike their Silla counterparts which are highly stylized; these branches are elaborate and ornamental in style.

There is still uncertainty about who the crown is for. It is believed to be for the leader of the region and is unlikely that it was a crown for the king. The crown may have been made from the region it was excavated or sent as a gift by the Baekje king to his vassal.

== Gallery ==
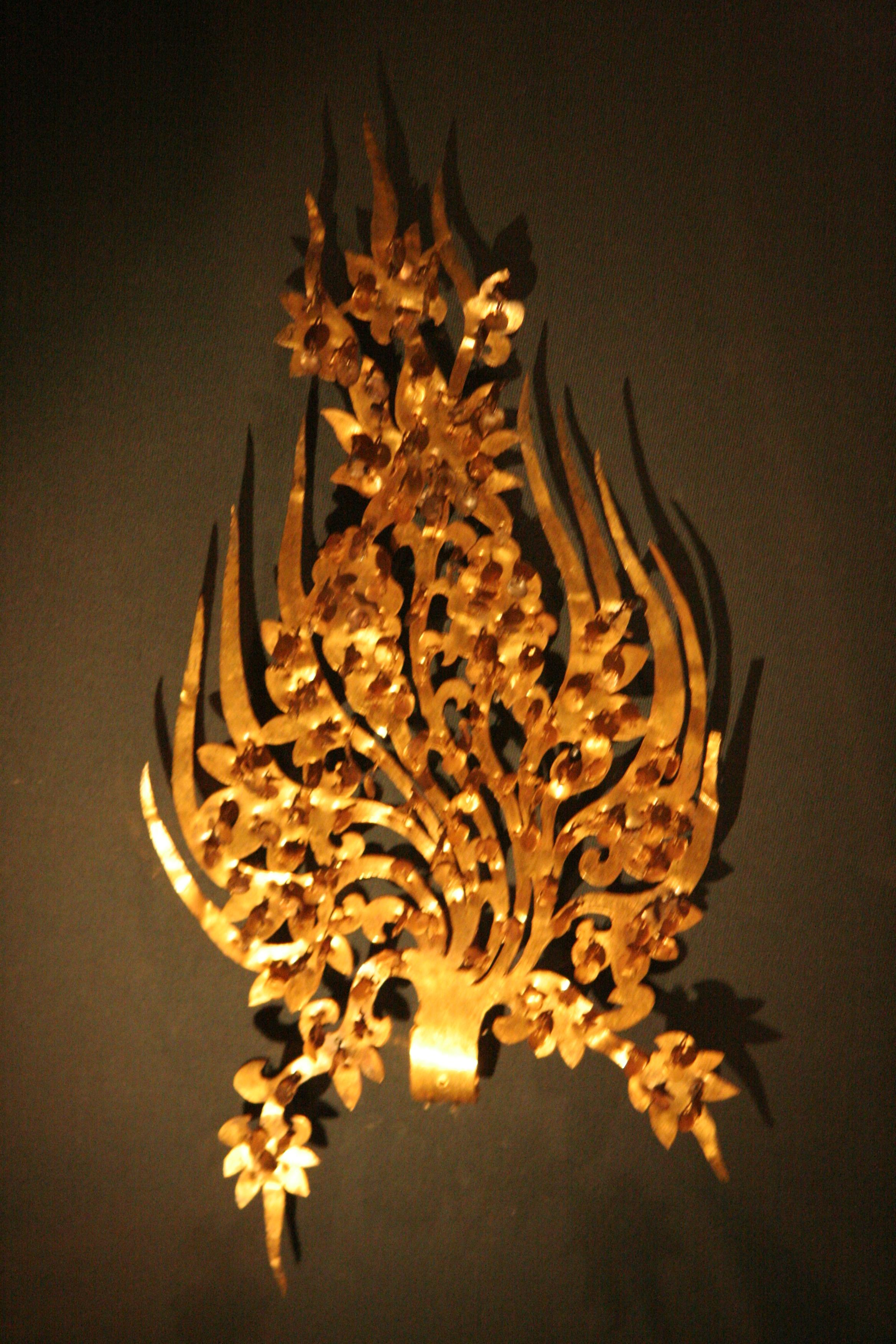
A close up of one of King Muryeong's diadem ornaments.

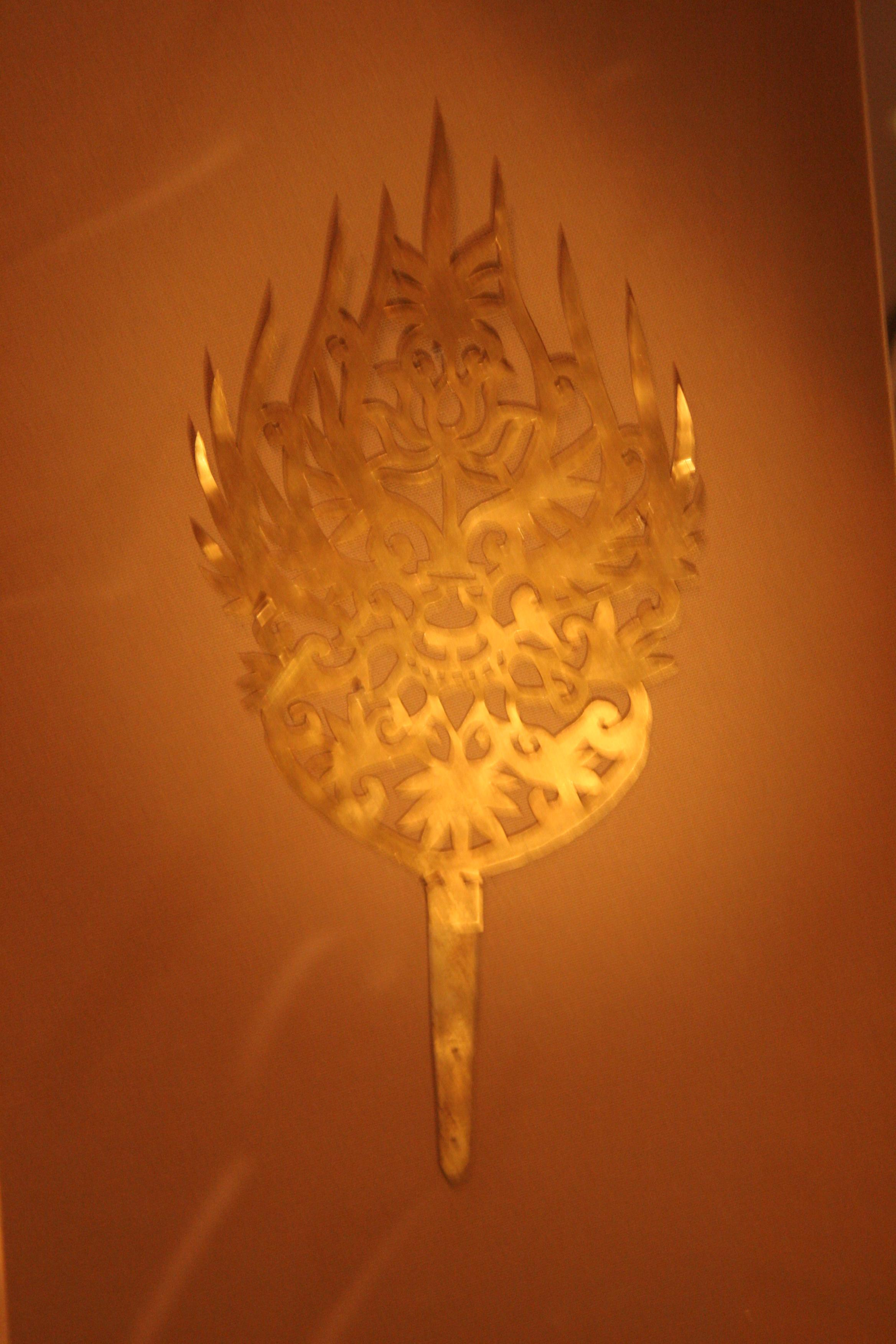
A close up of one of the queen's ornaments excavated from the tomb.

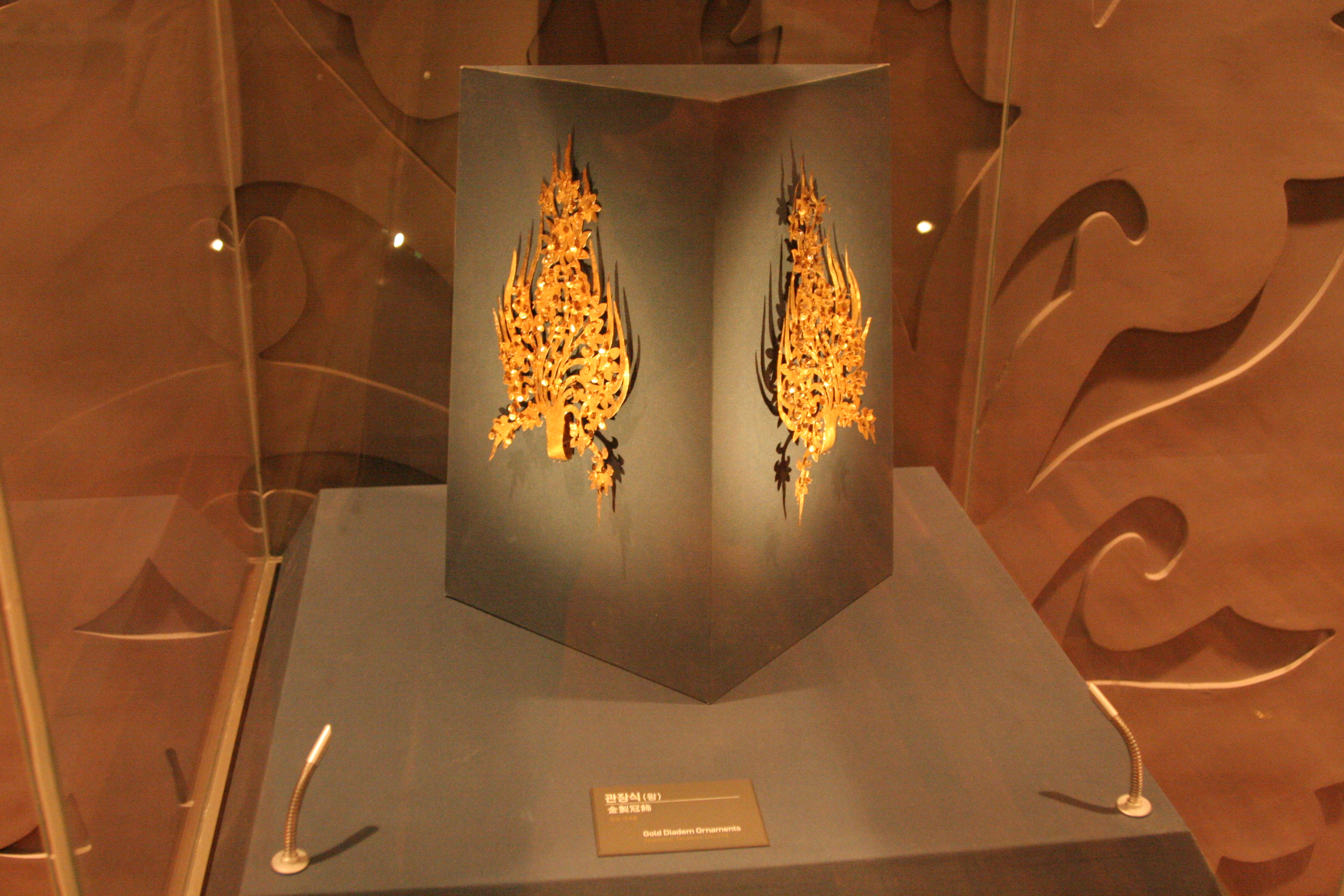
National Treasure of Korea No.154.

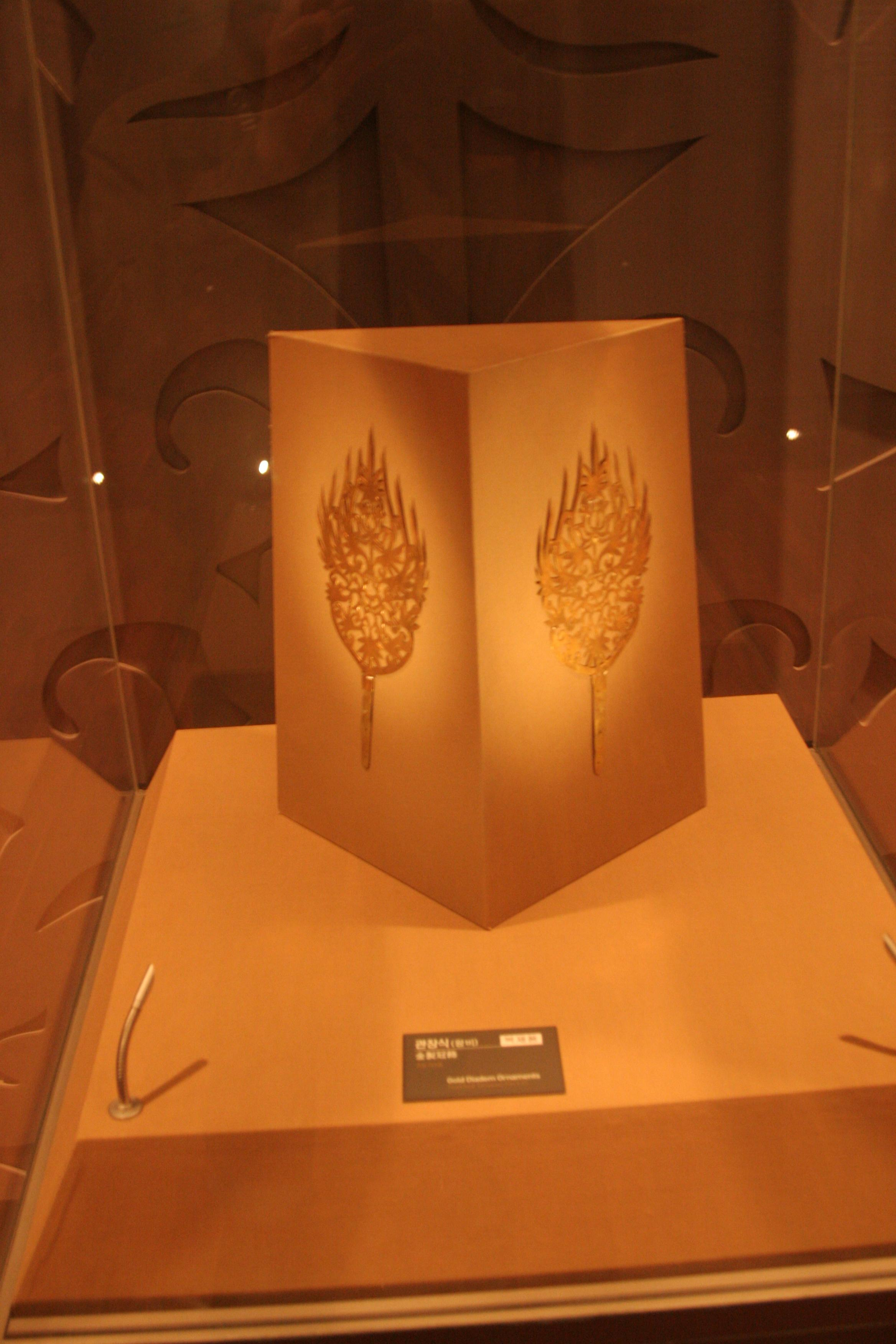
National Treasure of Korea No.155.

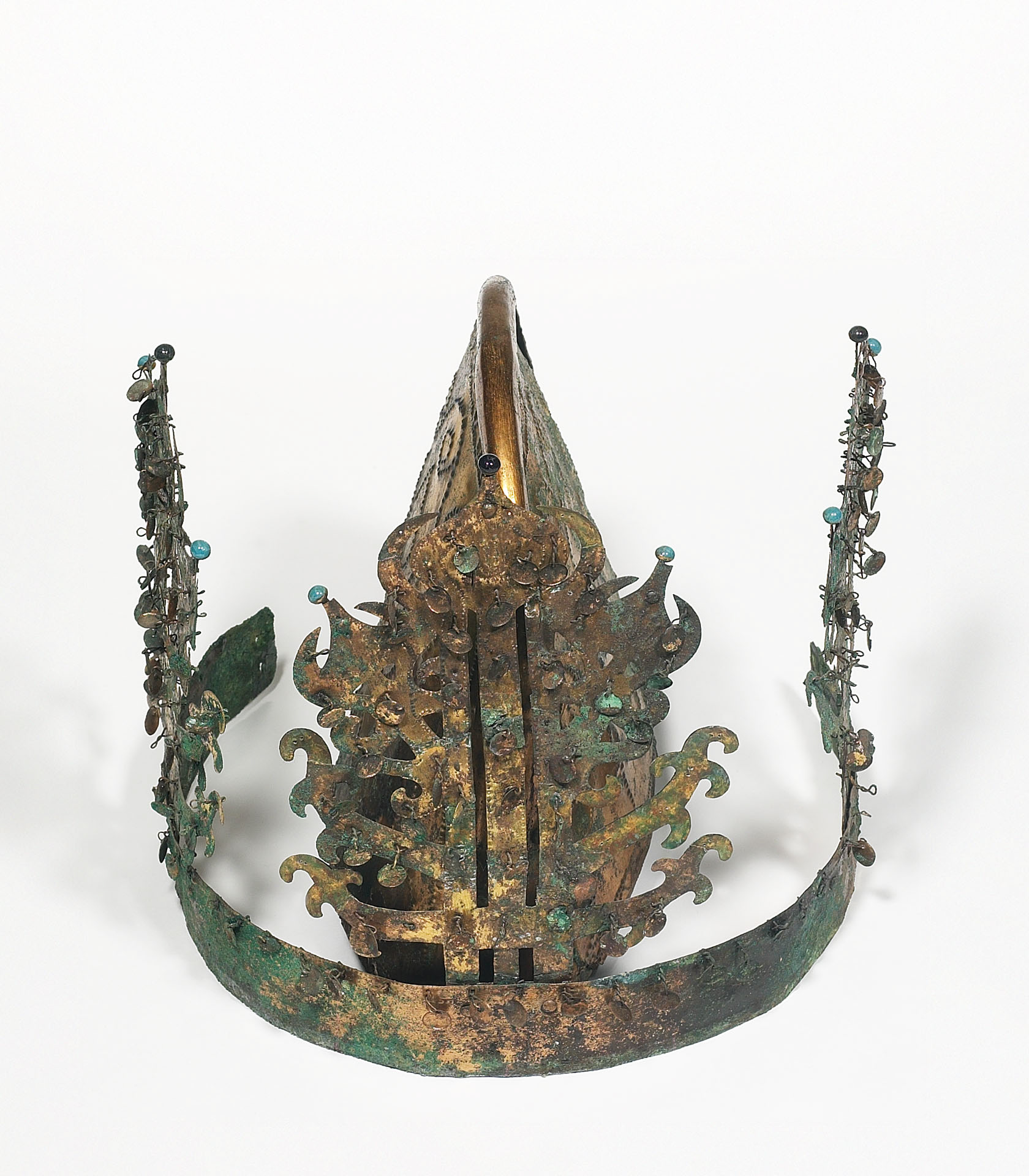
Gilt-bronze Crown from Sinchon-ri, Naju, National Treasure of Korea No.295.

== See also ==
- History of Korea
- Three Kingdoms of Korea
- Korean art
- Crown of Silla
- Crown of Gaya
- King Muryeong's Tomb
