= Buddha Maitreya (sculpture) =

- 北魏太和十年 青銅鎏金彌勒佛像 (Chinese)
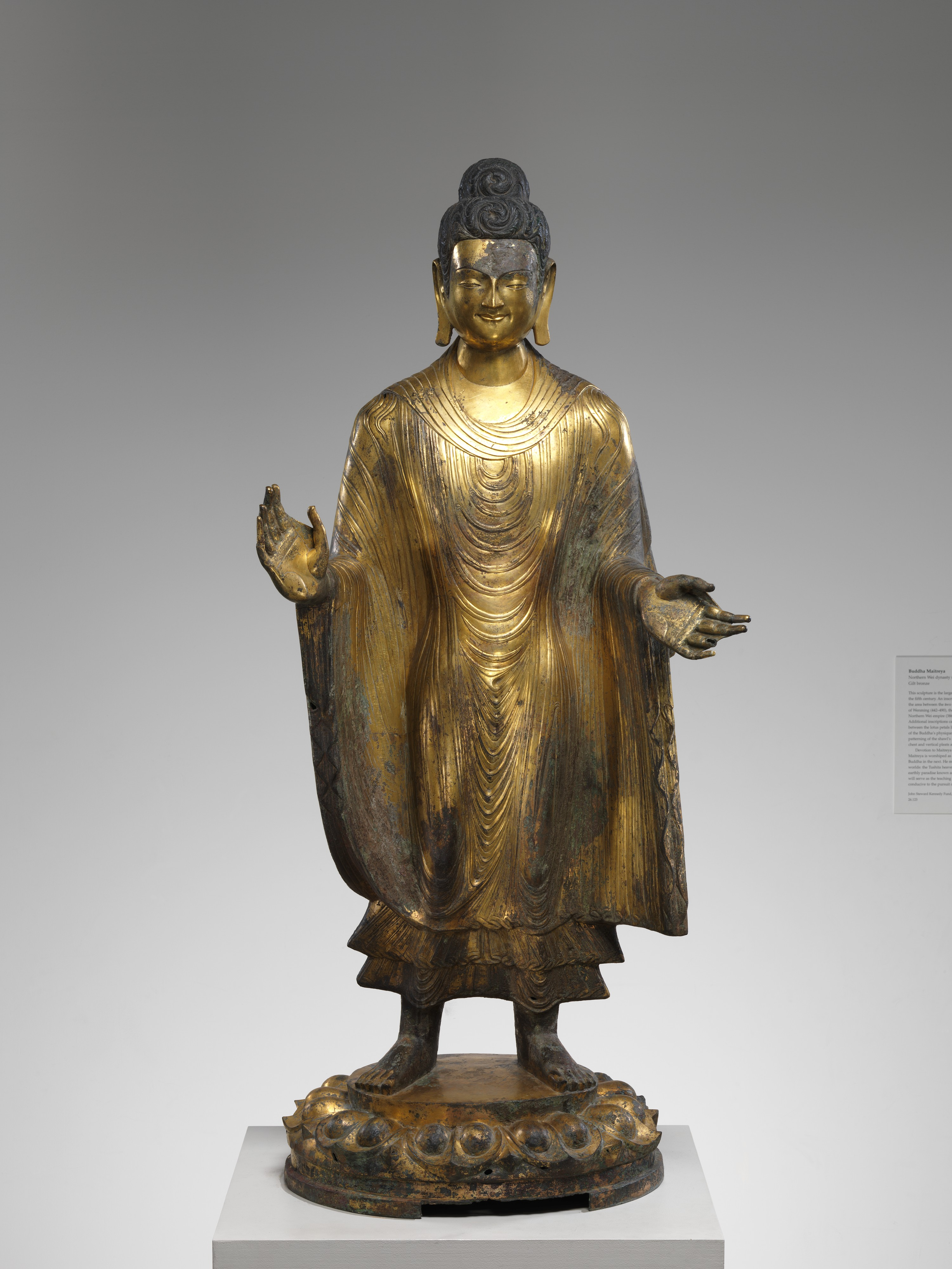
- Year: 486
- Medium: Gilt bronze
- Dimensions: 140.3 cm × 62.2 cm × 48.9 cm (55.2 in × 24.5 in × 19.3 in)
- Location: Metropolitan Museum of Art; New York City

The Buddha Maitreya is a statue of Maitreya dated to 5th century China. Made from gilt bronze, the state is the largest early gilt-bronze Chinese sculpture. The statue is in the collection of the Metropolitan Museum of Art.
