= Gilt-bronze Maitreya in Meditation (National Treasure No. 83) =

Gilt-bronze statue depicting Maitreya

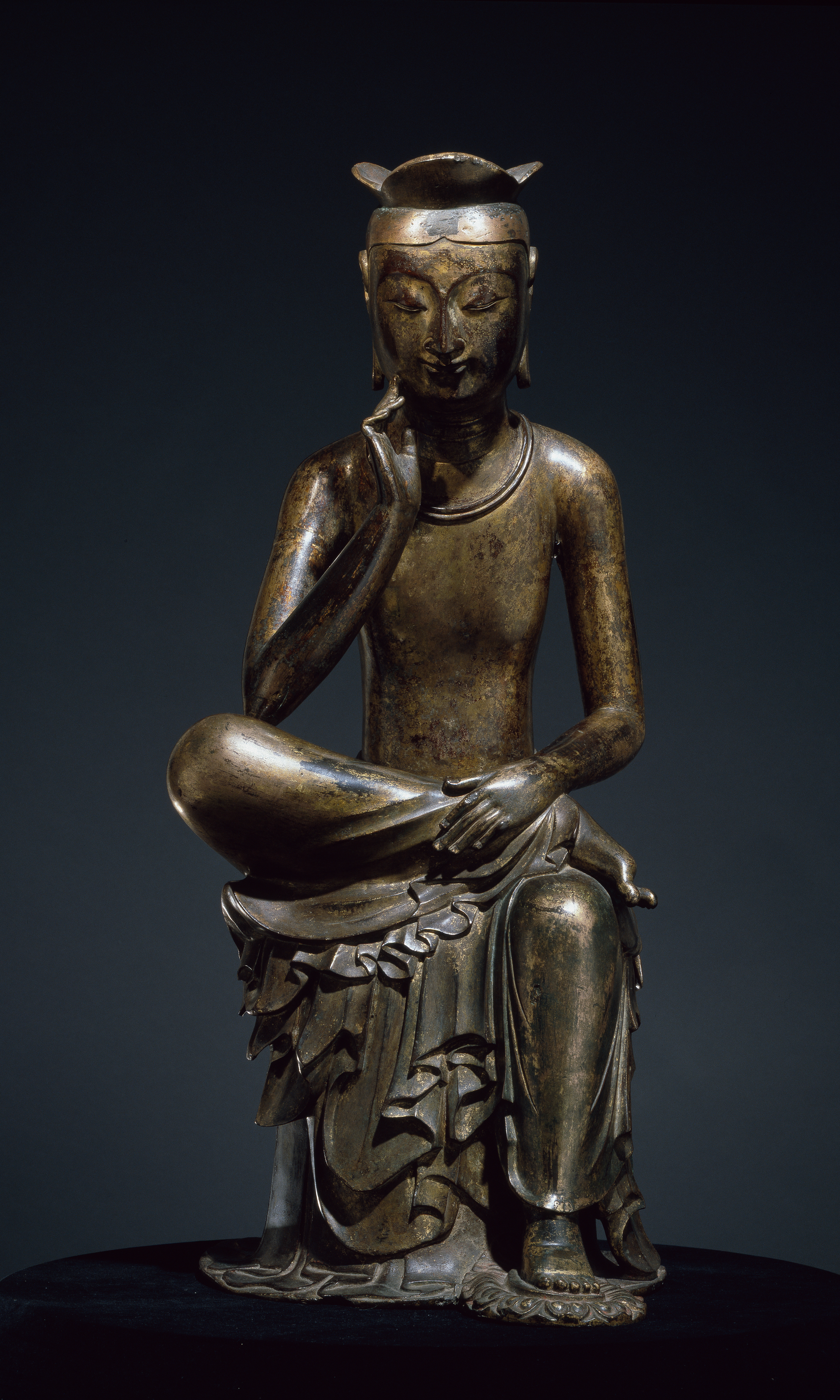

Korean name
- Hangul: 금동 미륵보살 반가상
- Hanja: 金銅彌勒菩薩半跏像
- Revised Romanization: Geumdong Mireuk Bosal ban-gasang
- McCune–Reischauer: Kŭmdong Mirŭk Posal pan'gasang

The Gilt-bronze Maitreya in Meditation (Korean: 금동 미륵보살 반가상; Hanja: 金銅彌勒菩薩半跏像) is a gilt-bronze statue of what is believed to be the Maitreya, the future Buddha, in a semi-seated contemplative pose. It is commonly referred to as the Contemplative Bodhisattva, Pensive Bodhisattva, or Gilt-Bronze Seated Maitreya in English. In Korean it is frequently referred to as pan'gasayusang. It is the National Treasure of Korea No. 83.

The statue is believed to have been made in the early 7th century. Recent scholarship consensus indicates that the statue is probably from Silla because of drapery fold studies although some believe that this was a Baekje piece. It is 93.5 centimeters tall or approximately 3 feet and one inch in height, and is therefore especially valuable because few large bronzes survive from that period. It is made of bronze, and was at one point plated in gold.

The statue is widely acknowledged to be one of the finest Buddhist sculptures ever produced and is a masterpiece of Korean art. It is now housed at the National Museum of Korea and is one of the most popular exhibits there.

National Treasure No.83, although priceless, is insured for an estimated 50 billion won and is the most expensive national treasure of Korea.

== Origins ==
=== Significance of the Maitreya Image ===
The Maitreya images were a popular subject for sculptors as well as worshippers during the Three Kingdoms period. A large majority of the pan'gasayusang statues were produced over a period of 100 years, from the late 6th century to the early Unified Silla period. This transitional time period was marked by much political turbulence, and Buddhism as a whole as well as the Maitreya played a significant symbolic role leading up to the peninsula's citation.

=== Origin of Pose ===
The bodhisattva is sculpted seated on a stool with his right leg crossed over his left knee, and one finger rests delicately on his face, upon which there is a thoughtful expression. The pose itself, first conceived in India and then transmitted through China, is associated with an event that actually occurred in Sakyamuni Buddha's life before his renouncement when he was still a prince. While observing farmers till the fields, Siddhartha Gautama awakened to the cyclical nature of human suffering: the Maitreya images depict the posture at this moment of awakening. The pose of the legs had become specifically that of bodhisattvas, not of Buddhas.

== Description ==
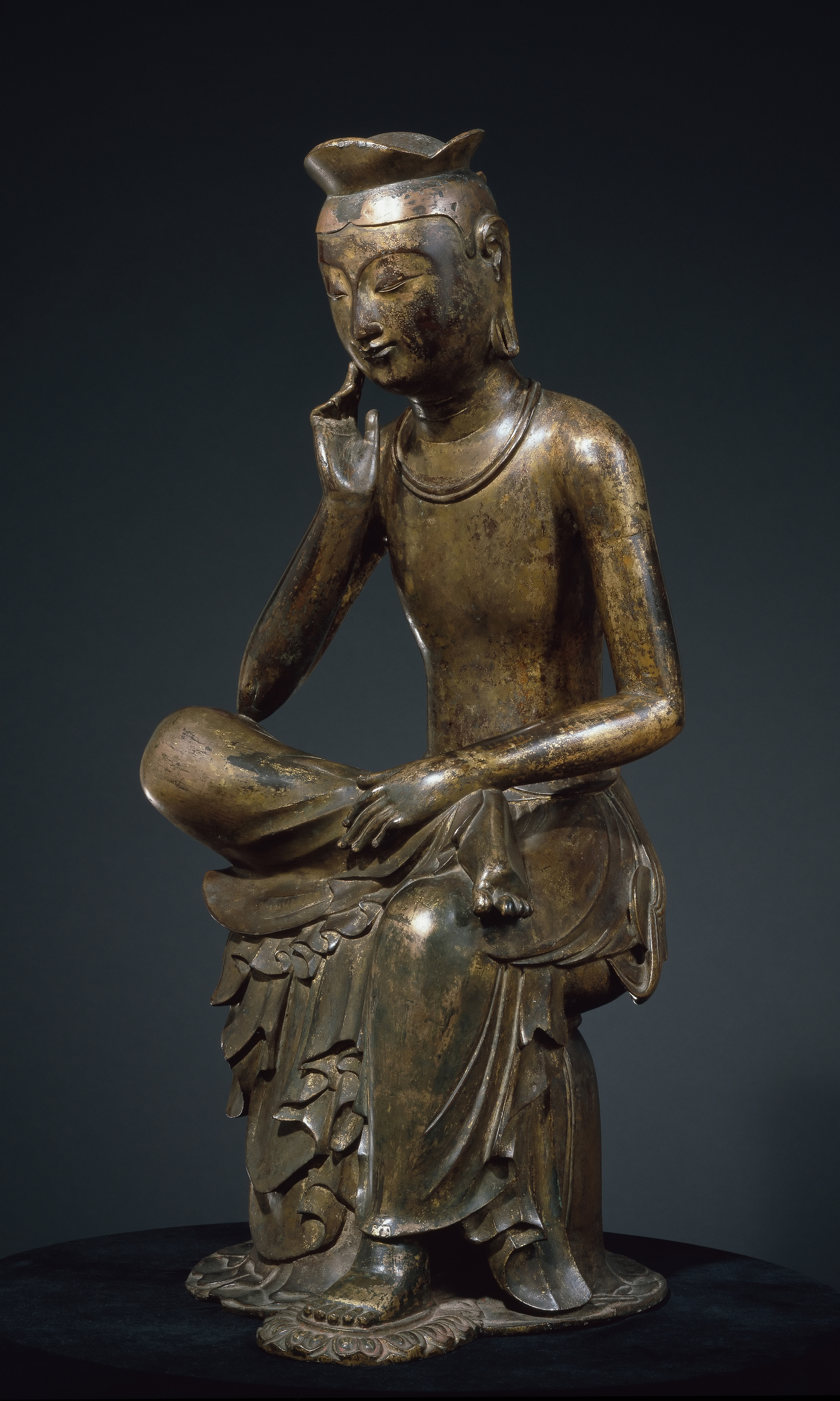
A side profile of the sculpture

The statue is seated on a round pedestal and posed with its right leg crossed over its left knee while the figure's right hand is touching its cheek and the left hand rests on the crossed leg. This contemplative pose was a popular subject of Buddhist art and the archetype spread from India to China and Korea and then to Japan. Other common similarities of the Maitreya statues of this style is the use of drapery on the seat on which the figure sits. Chinese depictions of the drapery that the Maitreya sits on are highly stylized, stiff, and formalized. However, the artists' depiction of the drapery on the Korean statue is flowing and realistic which gives the statue an illusion of animation. The slender, almost lithe body of the figure suggests Baekje influences. However, the bridgeline and sharp nose of the figure suggests a Silla provenance. Although the actual provenance of the statue is still unknown, the current art historian consensus is that the statue is from a Sillan caster because of the Silla-style of the drapery depicted over the pedestal.

That the figure is perfectly proportional and the sensuality of the draping both suggest that the sculptor based this work on a real model. Other figures of the Maitreya-type are often distorted or stylized to fit the artistic tradition the sculptor was working from. The harmony between the lower half and upper half of the statue is example of the attention to detail and realistic proportionality. The figure has a tri-fold crown on its head which is very simple, unlike other works of this genre which have highly elaborate headdresses. The halo of the figure has long since been lost although a part of the halo construct remains attached to the figure. The statue is also bare-chested which adds to the simplicity of the figure. The figure gives a sense of calm meditation but still conveys a sense of moving dynamism because of its posture and the artistic styling of the bronze.

== Similar works ==
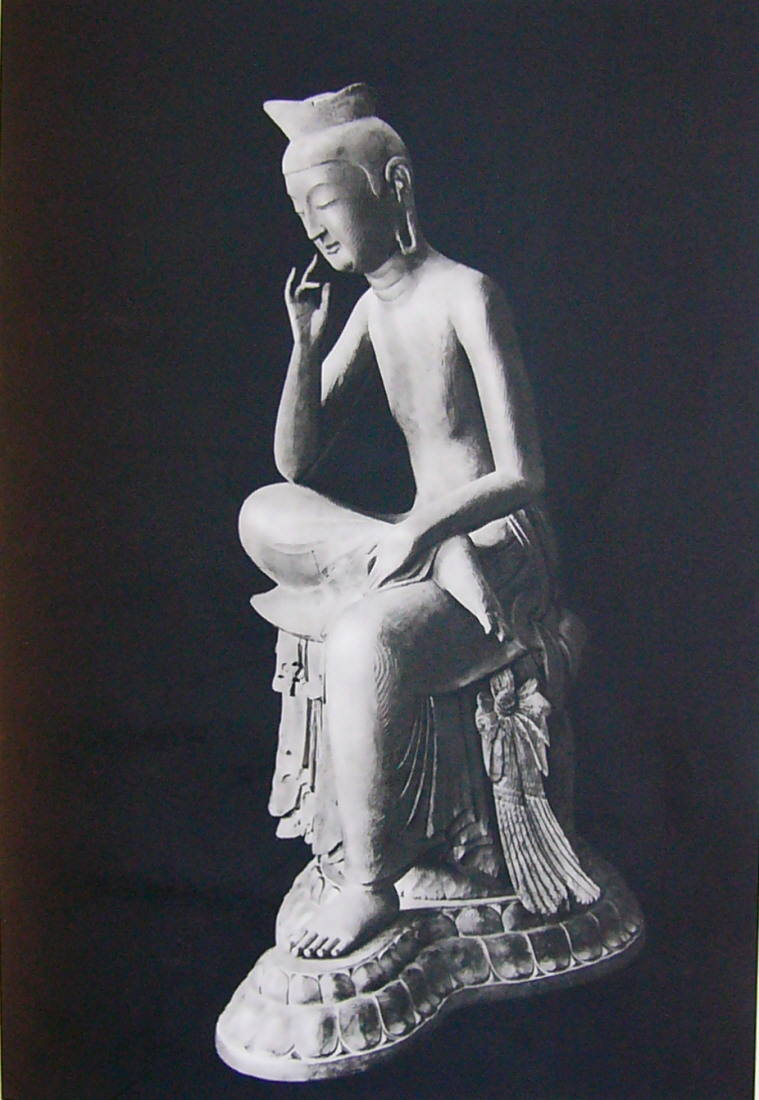
Miroku bosatsu at the Koryu-ji Temple of Kyoto

The Miroku bosatsu at the Koryu-ji Temple of Kyoto, which is one of the Japanese National Treasures, is the twin of the statue and is almost certainly of Korean origin. The Miroku is carved from red pine and may be the statue the Nihon Shoki mentions that a King of Silla sent to the Yamato court. The statues both share the elegant contemplative pose, highly proportional figures, realistic draperies, slim bodies, and plain tri-fold crowns.

The statue is often compared to Auguste Rodin's work, The Thinker because of its contemplative pose.

== See also ==
- Gilt-bronze Maitreya in Meditation (National Treasure No. 78)
- National treasures of Korea
- Choi, Soon-woo. A Journey to Korean Beauty. Seoul: Hak-ko-jae, 2002
- Covell, Jon Carter. In Search of Korean Cultural Roots. Translated by Yu Kyung Kim. Seoul: Hak-ko-hae, 1999.
- Index of Buddhism-related articles
- Korean Spirit and Culture Promotion Project. Fifty Wonders of Korea Volume I: Culture and Art. 2nd ed. Seoul: Samjung Munhwasa, 2009. 77–81.
- Secular Buddhism
