= Gilt-bronze Maitreya in Meditation (National Treasure No. 78) =

Korean Buddhist sculpture

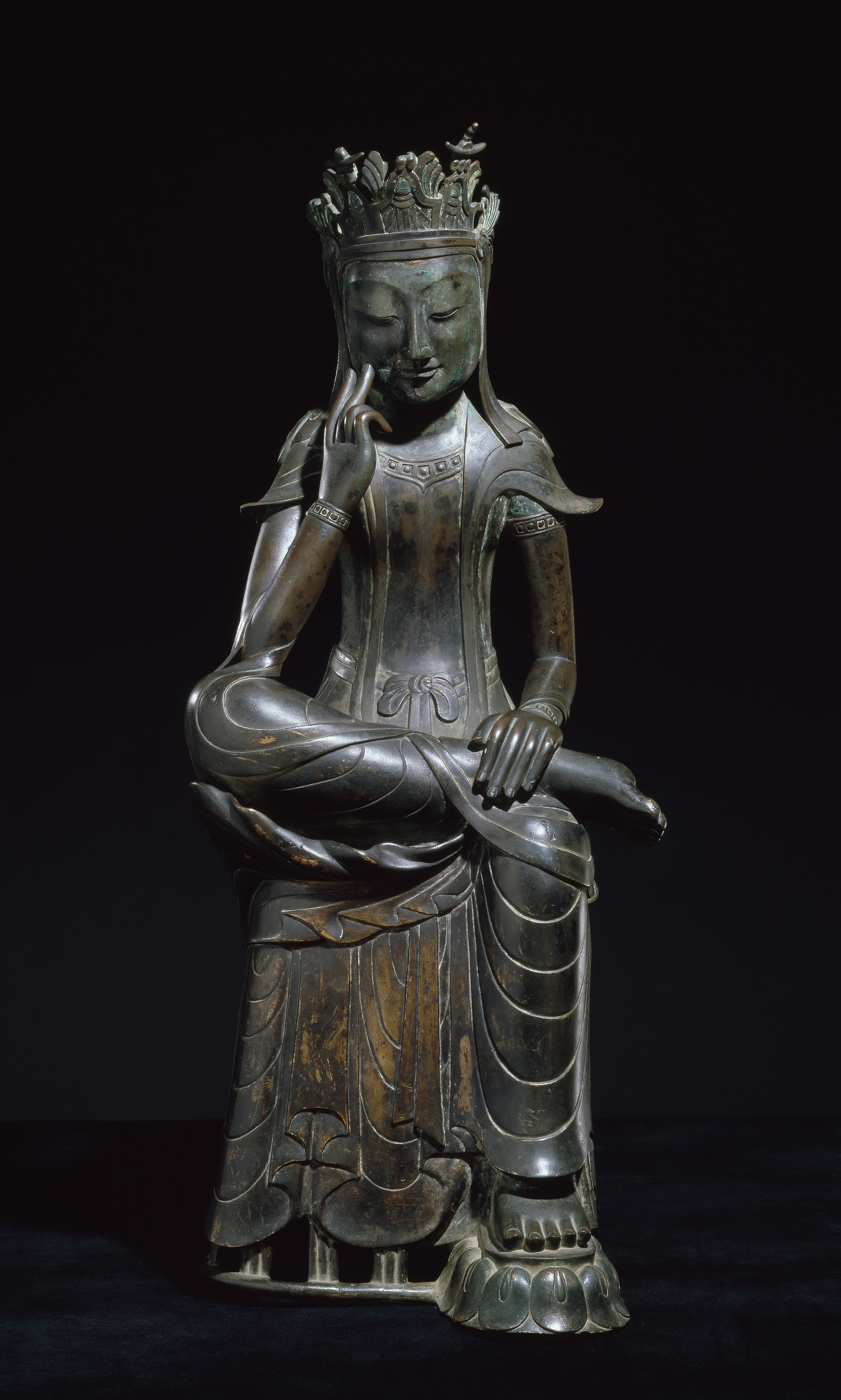
- Artist: Unknown
- Year: 6th century
- Catalogue: 78 (NT number)
- Type: Gilt-bronze statue
- Dimensions: 83.2 cm (32.8 in)
- Designation: National Treasure
- Location: National Museum of Korea; Seoul, South Korea

- Gilt-bronze Maitreya in Meditation
- Hangul: 금동 미륵보살 반가상
- Hanja: 金銅彌勒菩薩半跏像
- Revised Romanization: Geumdong Mireuk Bosal ban-gasang
- McCune–Reischauer: Kŭmdong Mirŭk Posal pan'gasang

The Gilt-bronze Maitreya in Meditation is a gilt-bronze statue of Maitreya seated in meditation and is one of the best known and most highly regarded Korean Buddhist sculptures. Now part of the collection of the National Museum of Korea, it was designated as the 78th national treasure of Korea.

The statue is 83.2 centimeters in height. It was cast from bronze and gilded, probably in the middle or late 6th century. The bronze is less than one centimeter in thickness (and as thin as 2 mm) which attests to the skills of bronze-workers during this time period.

In 1912 a Japanese person acquired it, and donated it to the General Governing Department of Japan over Joseon. Since 1916 it has been housed at the National Museum of Korea.

The maitreya is semi-seated on a stool with its right leg crossed over the left in deep meditation. The face of the statue, has a hint of a smile, and exhibits a sense of serene concentration. The right arm of the statue, at the elbow, rests on its lap while its delicate hand reaches towards its cheek giving the impression of deep thought. One shoulder of the maitreya is slightly higher than the other and the upper body is slightly bent forward which also creates the impresses on the viewer an aura of deep thought. The statue wears a crown which is rather elaborate with many prongs and parts of the crown rest on the shoulders of the maitreya. The statue is also dressed in a complicated scarf-like vestment that curves around the body with wing-like projections. The left foot rests on a base which is shaped like a lotus flower. The statue is probably of Silla provenance because of the style is more formalized than realistic.

At one point, the statue had a halo, but only traces of it remain. It was designated as the 78th national treasure of Korea on December 12, 1962. An X-ray analysis in 1963 showed that "it has no trace of defect or repair either inside or out, and that it was made of a rare material using unique techniques.".

== See also ==
- Gilt-bronze Maitreya in Meditation (National Treasure No. 83)
- National treasures of Korea
