= Crowns of Silla =

South Korean national treasure

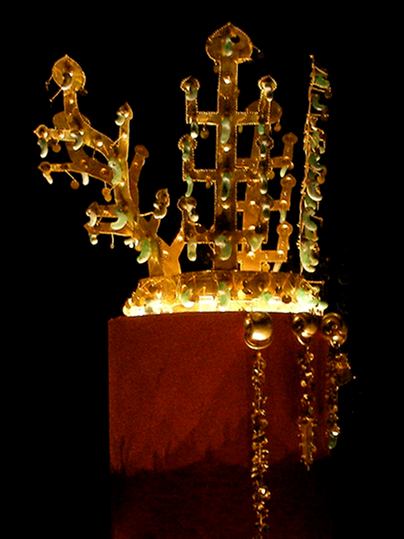
A gold crown from Hwangnamdaechong National Treasure No. 191.

The gold crowns of Silla (Korean: 신라 금관) are a collection of royal crowns from the early Silla period, believed to have been made between the 4th and 6th centuries. These crowns were excavated in Gyeongju, the former capital of Silla, and some of them are designated National treasures of South Korea.

As of 2025, there are 130 excavated crowns with most of them being tree-shaped.

== Introduction ==
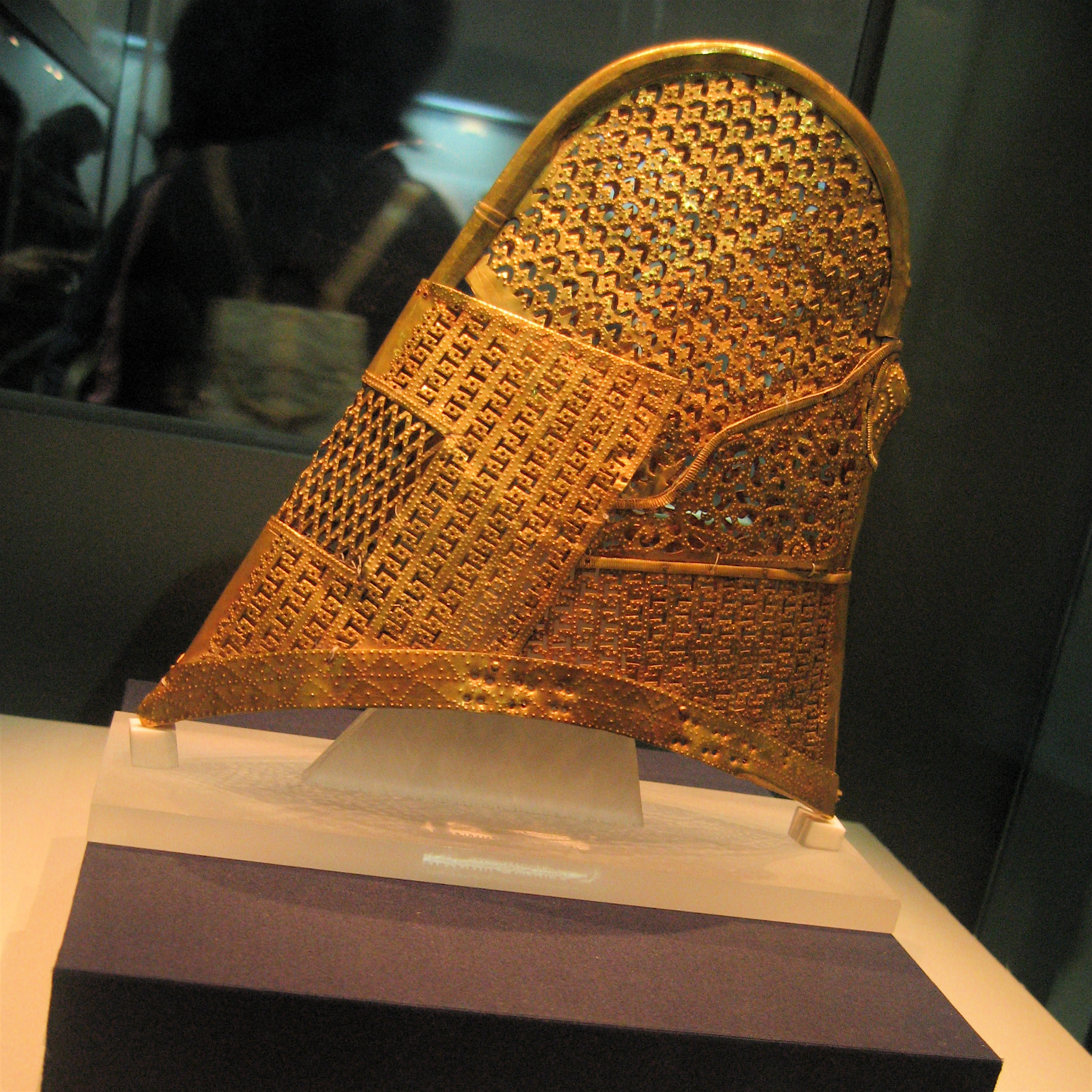
A golden inner cap of a Silla crown from the sixth century.

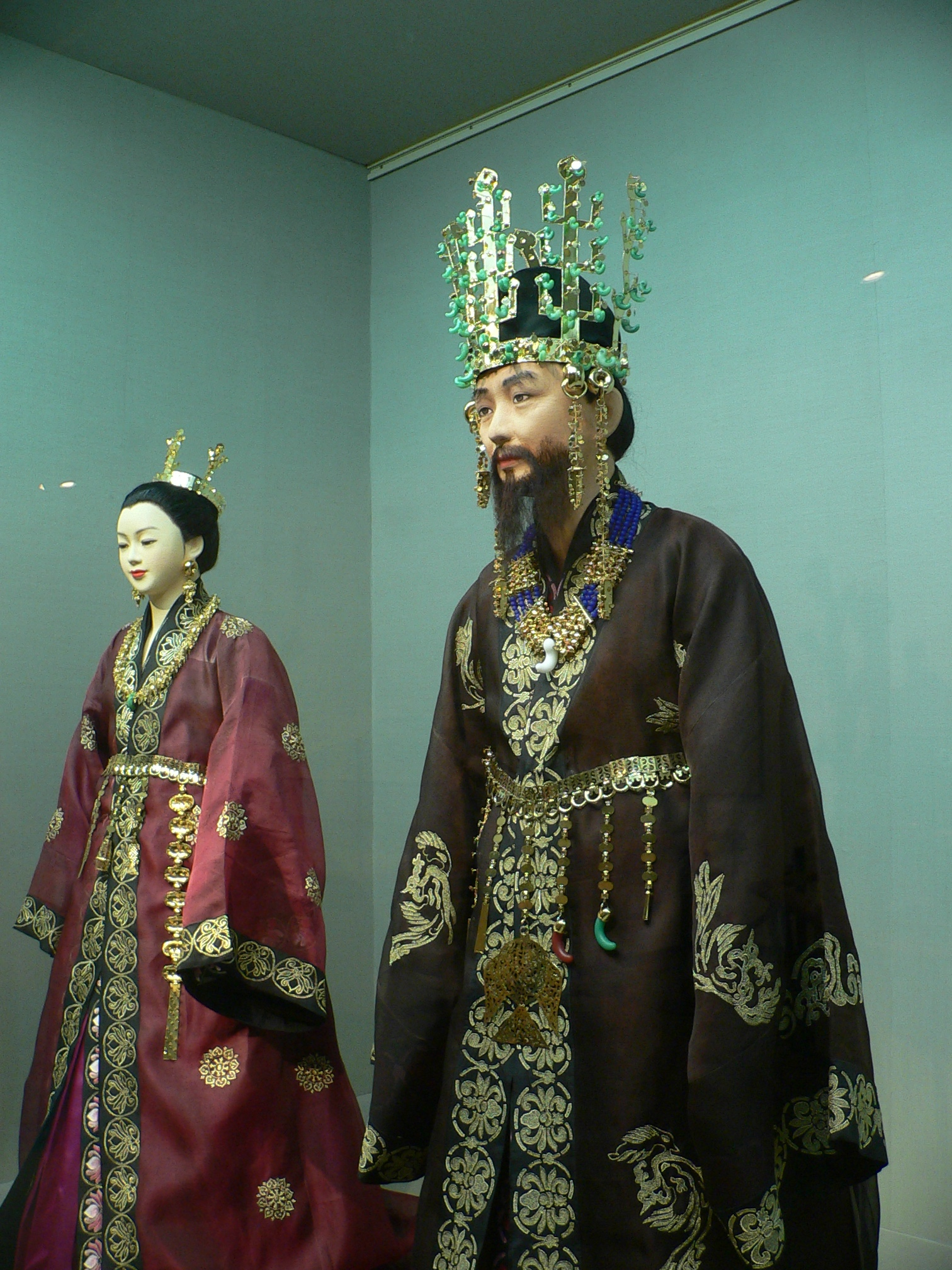
The crown jewels of Silla.

The Silla crowns were uncovered in the tumuli of Gyeongju, South Korea, the capital of Silla and Unified Silla. Silla tumuli, unlike their Baekje and Goguryeo counterparts were made inaccessible because the tombs did not include passageways and corridors. Instead, deep pits were dug and lined with wood and this is where the treasures and coffin were placed. These burial pits were covered in dirt and sealed with clay and then the surface was covered with massive river boulders which were then covered with massive mounds of dirt. The heavy boulders also served to push the tombs deeper into the ground, thus making them even more inaccessible. The Silla burial mechanism made it so that grave robbers and foreign invaders could never steal their precious contents. Some of the crowns are made of pure gold and were probably reserved for kings. Other crowns have been discovered made from gilt-bronze or gold-plated bronze, probably for princes or lesser kings. Silla crowns have been excavated from the 5th century Gold Crown Tomb, and the 6th century Gold Bell Tomb and Heavenly Horse Tomb. The adoption of Buddhism by the Silla kings in 528 A.D. led to the eventual decline of the practice of burying gold artifacts in tombs and by the end of the sixth century the practice had stopped.

== History ==
Silla has developed a culture of ambition and delicate style, and after unification, it shows a more splendid and refined aspect. Relics excavated from various tombs of Silla have many ornaments from the ruling class of Silla.

The order in which the gold crowns were made is generally considered to be that of Hwangnamdaechong → Geumgwanchong → Seobongchong → Geumnyeongchong → Cheonmachong. Also, the crowns from earlier tombs tend to have higher gold content.

== Symbolism of the crown ==
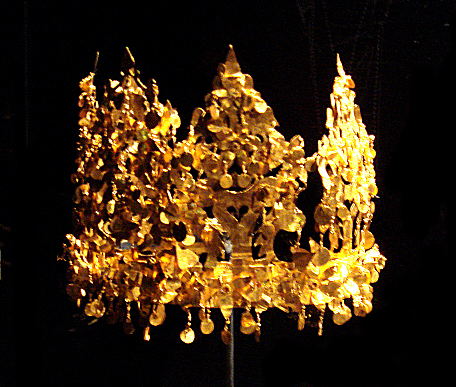
This crown was excavated from Grave Six in Tillia Tepe, Afghanistan and is estimated to be from the first or second century. The style of the crown strongly suggests a Scytho-Iranian connection with Korea.

The styling of the outer part of the crowns suggests a Korean connection with the Scytho-Iranians (Saka) through contact with people of the Eurasian steppe. The crowns are a uniquely Korean product and show no Chinese influence. The Silla crown is also notably distinct from the crown of Baekje, the crown of Gaya, and the crown of Goguryeo kingdoms. The tree motif of the crown is commonly believed to represent the idea of the world tree which was an important tenet of Siberian and Iranian shamanism.

However, some believe that the trident-like protrusions symbolize mountains or even birds. Additionally, the antler-like prongs also indicate a strong connection to Korean Shamanism or the importance of the reindeer.

A crown in Afghanistan (see image) bears a strong resemblance to the other Korean crowns which is also evidence of a Scytho-Iranian connection. Additionally, the sophisticated metalworking of the crowns of Silla show that Silla gold smiths held an advanced knowledge of working with gold. Some have even theorized that these advanced goldworking techniques, such as granulation and filigree, came from the Greek or the Etruscan people, especially because Silla tumuli also contain beads and glassware which came from as far away as the Mediterranean Sea. But research and historical documents suggest a Persian connection or even origin. It is worth noting, however, that the Silla smiths achieved a level of micro-granulation that is arguably more delicate than many contemporary Western examples. In terms of pure technical skill, Silla goldworking is considered peerless for its era. While Greek jewelry reached its technical peak earlier (Hellenistic period, 323–31 BCE), the Silla period (specifically the 5th century) produced works that were technically more complex in their mechanical assembly. a Silla crown is not a single cast object; it is an assembly of hundreds of individual parts (spangles, jade, wire, and sheet gold) that require a sophisticated understanding of tension and structural integrity. The Silla artisans also mastered the "cold-joining" of gold, allowing for pieces that were flexible and dynamic.

Iron objects were introduced to the Korean Peninsula through trade with chiefdoms and state-level societies in the Yellow Sea area in the 4th century BC, just at the end of the Warring States Period but before the Western Han dynasty began.

The delicate nature of the gold crowns comes from the fact they were made from cutting thin sheet gold. The crown is impractical to wear and some believe that the crown may have been made specifically as a burial good. In addition, there is no evidence of Korean monarchs wearing these crowns while living through portraits or other written descriptions. These comma-shaped jewels of jade and glass may have symbolized the fruits and the bounty of trees. The use of many tiny gold mirrors dangling from the crown has led some to hypothesize that the crown, worn in sunlight, would be a dazzling spectacle reinforcing the tradition role of the Silla king as the symbolic representation of the sun on earth.

The crowns come in two major parts. The inner part is a golden cap, which may have been covered in silk. This cap would sit within the band of the outer crown. There is a third part of the crown, namely the chains of gold with attached jade that may have been attached to the outer band. However, there is significant controversy over how the crown was supposed to be worn. Some believe that the three total parts were supposed to be worn together in one crown. However, the fact that the three parts of the crown have been found in three distinct areas of certain tombs, such as the Heavenly Horse Tomb suggests that the three objects are, in fact, three different types of crowns for different occasions.

=== In modern Korea ===
As a symbol of contemporary intercultural connection, the Silla crown's symbolism gained renewed significance at the 2025 APEC diplomatic stage, where U.S. President Trump received a replica of the Cheonmachong Crown from the Korean government, illustrating how this ancient crown continues to play a diplomatic role linking Korea with the United States. This is interpreted as South Korea's hope for expanded U.S. cooperation to establish peaceful relations with North Korea. This interpretation is grounded in the unifying spirit of the APEC host city, which is famous for its gold crown and known as the first unified kingdom in ancient times.

== Lists of Crowns of Silla ==
South Korea has officially designated some Silla crowns as national treasures (Korean: 국보; Hanja: 國寶; RR: gukbo), others as treasures (Korean: 보물; Hanja: 寶物; RR: bomul).

Group	Image	Information
National Treasures		National Treasure No. 87 The Gold Crown from Geumgwanchong (Korean: 금관총 금관; Hanja: 金冠塚金冠; RR: Geumgwanchong geumgwan; MR: Kŭmgwanch'ong kŭmgwan) is the largest golden crown discovered. The Gold Crown Tomb (Geumgwanchong) was named after this treasure. It was designated as a national treasure on December 12, 1962. The crown is 44 centimeters in height and has a diameter of 19 centimeters. It is the largest golden crown from Silla discovered thus far. There are two parts to this crown. The outer band was discovered within the tomb while the inner cap was found outside of the tomb. The outer band consists of three tree-like branches which have three branches each. The Chinese character 出 chul is written three times on the head band. Additionally, the outer head band also has two antler-like protrusions on the left and right side. All of the protrusions have jade and glass beads and tiny golden mirrors that dangle from the branches. On the sides of the headband also are two chains of gold with leaf-like decorations that end with jade jewels. These two chains hang below the head band. The inner crown is a triangle-shaped hat made of thin sheet gold and has two wing-like decorations on it. The wings are believed to relate to Korean shamanistic beliefs. The crown is now in the Gyeongju National Museum and is a masterpiece of Korean art.
National Treasures		National Treasure No. 188 The Gold Crown from Cheonmachong Tomb (Korean: 천마총 금관; Hanja: 天馬塚金冠; RR: Cheonmachong geumgwan; MR: Ch'ŏnmach'ong kŭmgwan) is currently housed in Gyeongju National Museum. The crown was designated as the 188th National Treasure of Korea on December 7, 1978. The crown was found in Cheonmachong (Tomb No. 155, also known as The Heavenly Horse Tomb) in 1973 and is believed to be the crown of King Soji or King Jijeung. The crown is 32.5 centimeters in height. There are three prongs forming the Chinese character 山 "mountain" on the front of the crown. There are also two prongs in the shape of a deer antler on the back. This crown also has two dangling chains of gold in the shape of leaves hanging from the end of the headband. Notably, the tree-like prongs of this crown have four branches instead of the more common used three branch motif. There is still controversy of how this crown was to be worn because of where it was found in the tomb in relation to the coffin. The neo-Lines who interacted with the Sogdians on the Silk Road embraced the culture of nomads. Nomads perceived nature in three dimensions: low, medium, and high. This way of thinking appears as an ornament of deer, which means ground, trees connecting the ground to the sky, and birds flying in the sky. The Silla Geumgwan tells us that the Silla people actively interacted and flexibly embraced other cultures.
National Treasures		National Treasure No. 191 The Gold crown from Hwangnamdaechong (Korean: 황남대총 북분 금관; Hanja: 皇南大塚北墳金冠; RR: Hwangnamdaechong bukbun geumgwan) is currently housed in the National Museum of Korea and is one of the most popular exhibits there, along with the two Bangasayusang. It is a National Treasure of Korea and was named as one on December 12, 1978. The height of the crown is 27.5 centimeters and the gold chains and pendants that dangle from the crown, known as Suhasik are 13 to 30.3 centimeters in length. The crown is known for its abundant use of jade. The Suhasik are grouped into two groups of three and are arranged with the longest chains on the outer edge to the smallest chains closest to the front of the crown. The Suhasik also hold blue jade and golden leaves on the end of the chains. There is still a controversy of whether the Suhasik are actually a part of the crown, namely because the Suhasik were found separate from the crown when excavated. The crown has three tree-like prongs with three branches each and also has two antler-like prongs on the left and right side of the main band. The tree-like prongs of the crown have been interpreted by some scholars as the Chinese character for "mountain". Decorations of a deer antler are attached to the ends of the crown. 77 pieces of jade were adorned on the crown. Sixteen pieces of comma-shaped blue jade were attached to the Chinese characters, nine pieces of jade on the deer antler, and eleven pieces on the head girdle. This crown is particularly noted for its abundant use of jade. This crown may have been made for a queen and there is a significant controversy about who was buried in the tomb.
Treasures		Treasure No. 338 This crown, known as Gold crown from Geumnyeongchong Tumulus (Korean: 금령총 금관; Hanja: 金鈴塚金冠; RR: Geumnyeongchong geumgwan; MR: Kŭmnyŏngch'ong kŭmgwan), is currently housed at the National Museum of Korea. At 27 centimeters in heights and 15 centimeters in diameter, it is the smallest Silla crown discovered thus far, and the simplest. Like a typical Silla crown, it has five main prongs. The tree-like prongs, shaped like the Chinese character 出 chul, which means "going out", are placed on the front and sides of the headband. The tree-like prongs have four branches each. There are two antler-like prongs which flank the two side tree-like prongs. Additionally, there are birds on top of each branch. On the upper and lower part of the surface are two-lined spot patterns made with a stamping technique. Hanging ornaments hang at the right and left side of the crown frame. This crown has the distinction of being the only gold crown made solely of gold without any jade accoutrements.
Treasures		Treasure No. 339 The Gold crown from Seobongchong Tumulus (Korean: 서봉총 금관; Hanja: 瑞鳳塚金冠; RR: Seobongchong geumgwan; MR: Sŏbongch'ong kŭmgwan) is a gold crown of Silla origin that is now housed at the Gyeongju National Museum. The crown is 30.7 centimeters in height, 18.4 centimeters in diameter, and 24.7 high when the ornaments hanging from the headband. There are five branches standing on the broad crown frame which is stamped with a wave pattern and stamped in a form of a dotted line. The headband is decorated with leaf-shapes and bent jade. The right and left most branches, along with the middle branches of the five branches, are composed of the Chinese character 出 in three prongs. The tips of the branches are decorated with a budding flower ornament. Two crossing gold belts having the tip on the each 4 dividing points of the crown frame, construct the inside framework. At either side of the crown frame, styled-earrings are dangling from the headband.
Treasures		Treasure No. 631 The Silver crown (Korean: 은관〈98호 남분〉; Hanja: 銀冠〈98號南墳〉; RR: eungwan (98[= gusippal]ho nambun); MR: ŭn'gwan (98[= kusipp'ar]ho nambun)) from the south mound of Tumulus No. 98, is a silver crown and was found near the head of the body in the coffin of the tomb. The crown is currently housed in Gyeongju National Museum. The measurements of the crown are: 17.2 centimeters in height, 16.6 centimeters in diameter, the width of the headband is 3.2 centimeters. The crown has three prongs but they are unique to any other kind of Silla crown discovered thus far. The center prong is thick and shaped like a shield or a perhaps a shape bent like a bow with a high middle section. There is a silver plate attached to this prong. On either side of the center prong is a crescent-shaped prong. The outer side of these crescent-shaped prongs are cut and twisted to make feather-like protrusions which are unique to Silla art. However, there is an analogous example of this feather-like embellishment from a crown of Gaya providence found at the Uiseongtamni Tumulus. The Eungwan crown was uncovered in Tumuli Park of Michu Royal Tomb in Gyeongju. The mound is connected from the north and south and so has the shape of a gourd. With a diameter of 80 meters from east to west and 120 meters from north to south, it is the largest mound of Silla. The south mound is 23 meters in height, the north mound, which is where National Treasure No. 191 was uncovered, is 22 meters in height.

== See also ==
- Korean art
- Three Kingdoms of Korea
- History of Korea
- Crown of Baekje
- Crown of Gaya
- Crown jewels
