= Geumgwanchong =

Tomb in Gyeongju, South Korea

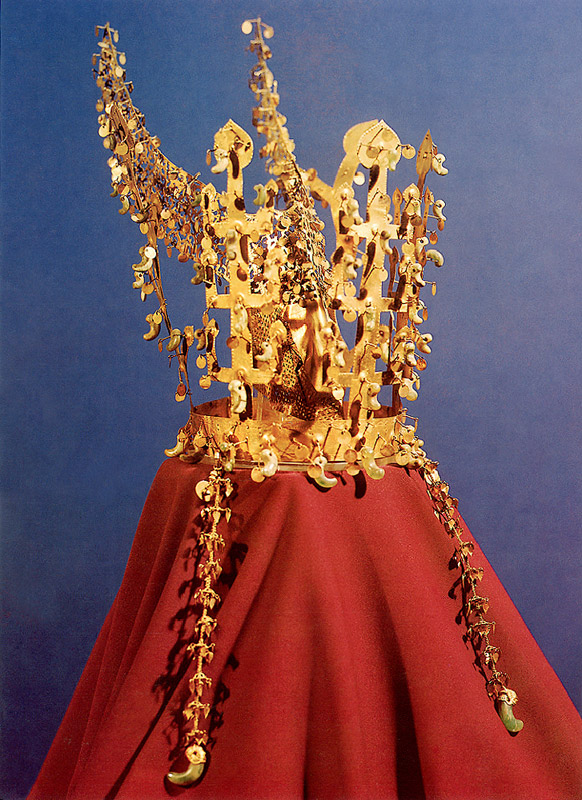
- A gold crown excavated from Geumgwanchong tomb. National Treasures of South Korea No. 87

Korean name
- Hangul: 금관총
- Hanja: 金冠塚
- RR: Geumgwanchong
- MR: Kŭmgwanch'ong

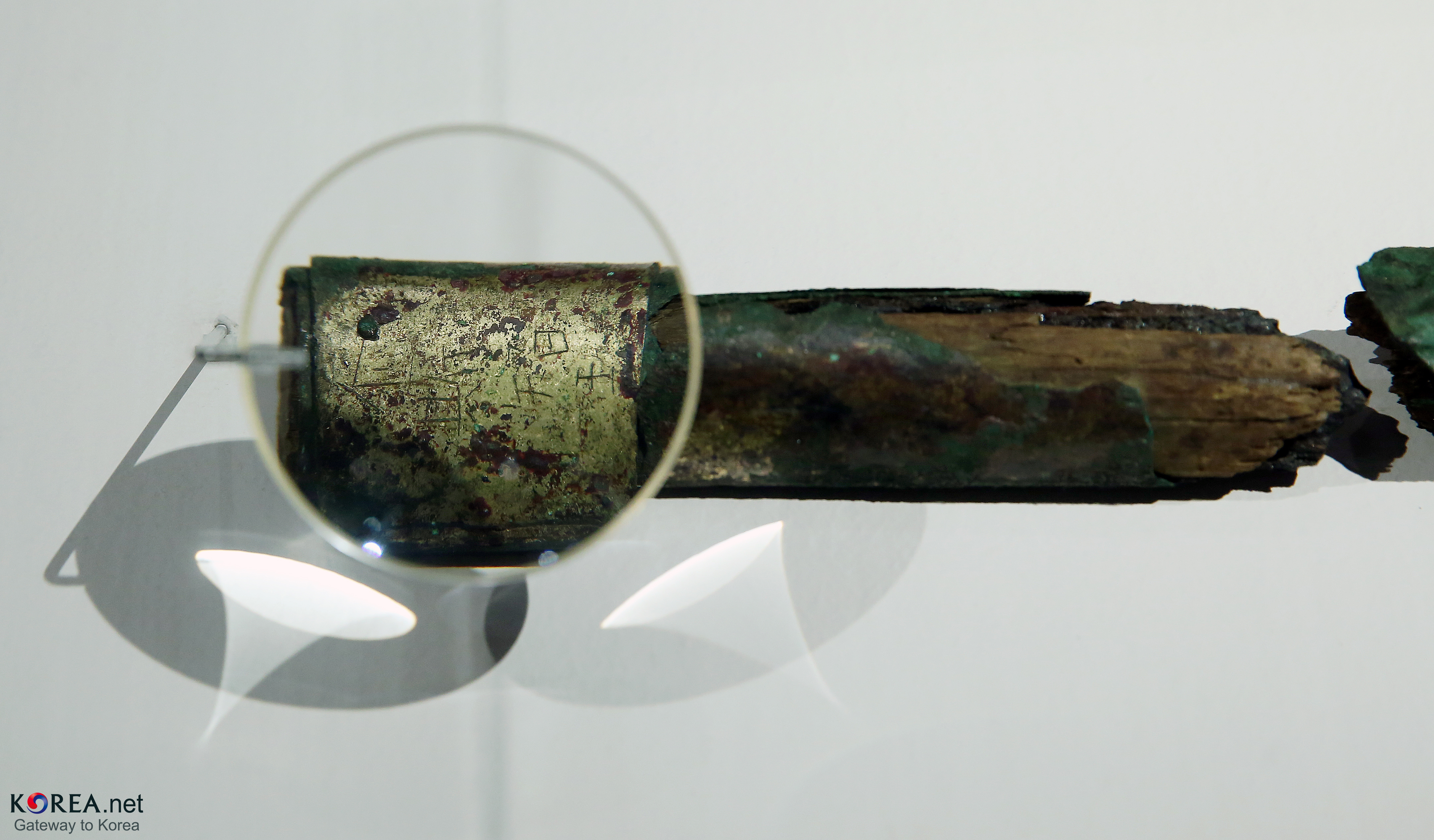
King Isaji's scabbard, also found in the Geumgwanchong Tomb. Four Chinese characters, 尒斯智王, meaning 'King Isaji', are seen under the magnifier.

Geumgwanchong (Korean: 금관총; Hanja: 金冠塚; lit. Gold crown tomb) is a Silla-era tumulus in modern-day Gyeongju, South Korea. Gyeongju was the capital of Silla. Believed to date from the fifth or sixth century CE, the tomb was excavated in 1921. It was the first tomb that was found to contain a gold crown of the Silla royalty, and is still the largest crown excavated thus far. The tomb takes its name from the crown. Over 40,000 other artifacts were recovered from the tomb, including "gold, silver, and bronze vessels, gold and silver weapons, gilt-bronze plate armor, stoneware vessels, 20,000 mainly blue Indo-Pacific beads, and horse fittings."

The diameter of the tomb is 45 m and the height is 12 m. Such stone mounded tombs only existed in the Shinar Era. It is believed that the tomb was varnished and lacquered. The structure of the tomb and the Buddhist influence suggest that it was built after the reign of King Jijeung. This would place the date around the 6th century, which was before the Unified Silla period. The Geumgwanchong has one burial mound, and the structure is simple and does not contain a special artifacts room.

== Excavation of the tomb ==
The artifacts were found in the process of construction work in the backyard of a private house in 1921. Surveying started immediately and Japanese interest in Silla tumuli rose with the beginning the excavation. As a result, other large tombs, such as Geumryungchong and Seabongchong, were discovered.

== Artifacts discovered ==
Gold and silver belt ornaments were excavated at the same time as the Gold Crown. They were made with a thin band of either gold or silver and had 17 pendants in various shapes. The silver belt ornaments have a similar design as those excavated in Baekje Royal Tomb, indicating contact between Silla and Baekje in the later half of the 5th century.

The vessels were made of gold and silver, gold and bronze alloying, and gold and bronze. In addition, pots with four corners and Korean traditional caldrons made of cast iron were inscribed with delicate engraving that showed relations with Goguryeo at the time. A bronze tripod pouring vessel is possibly of Chinese import. The working class of the time were unlikely to have used metal vessels and these vessels indicate the high quality of life of the Silla ruling class.

Weapons found included gold and silver swords and gold and bronze helmets and armor. The scabbard was ascribed with four Chinese characters 'King Isaji (尒斯智王)', which is regarded as the owner of the tomb. There are only speculations because no historical text mentioned about the king Isaji. Jabi of Silla and Soji of Silla are the candidates for the owner.

A golden girdle found in the tomb is another important symbol of royalty and is only found in royal tombs. The girdle is about two metres in length, and is made up of 39 plaques, with various charms dangling from the main belt.

The golden crown found in this tomb is notable for its intricate open metal-work inner cap containing images of bird wings, which is symbolic of shamanistic practices. The ornamentation of the crown is simple and balanced and features heart, fish scales, and diamond T shapes. A diadem ornament features an image of a bird about to fly. On the wings of the crown, a dragon pattern is engraved.

== See also ==
- History of Korea
- Korean sword
- Korean art
- Crown of Silla
