= Wolseong =

Former palace in Gyeongju, South Korea

Wolseong Palace
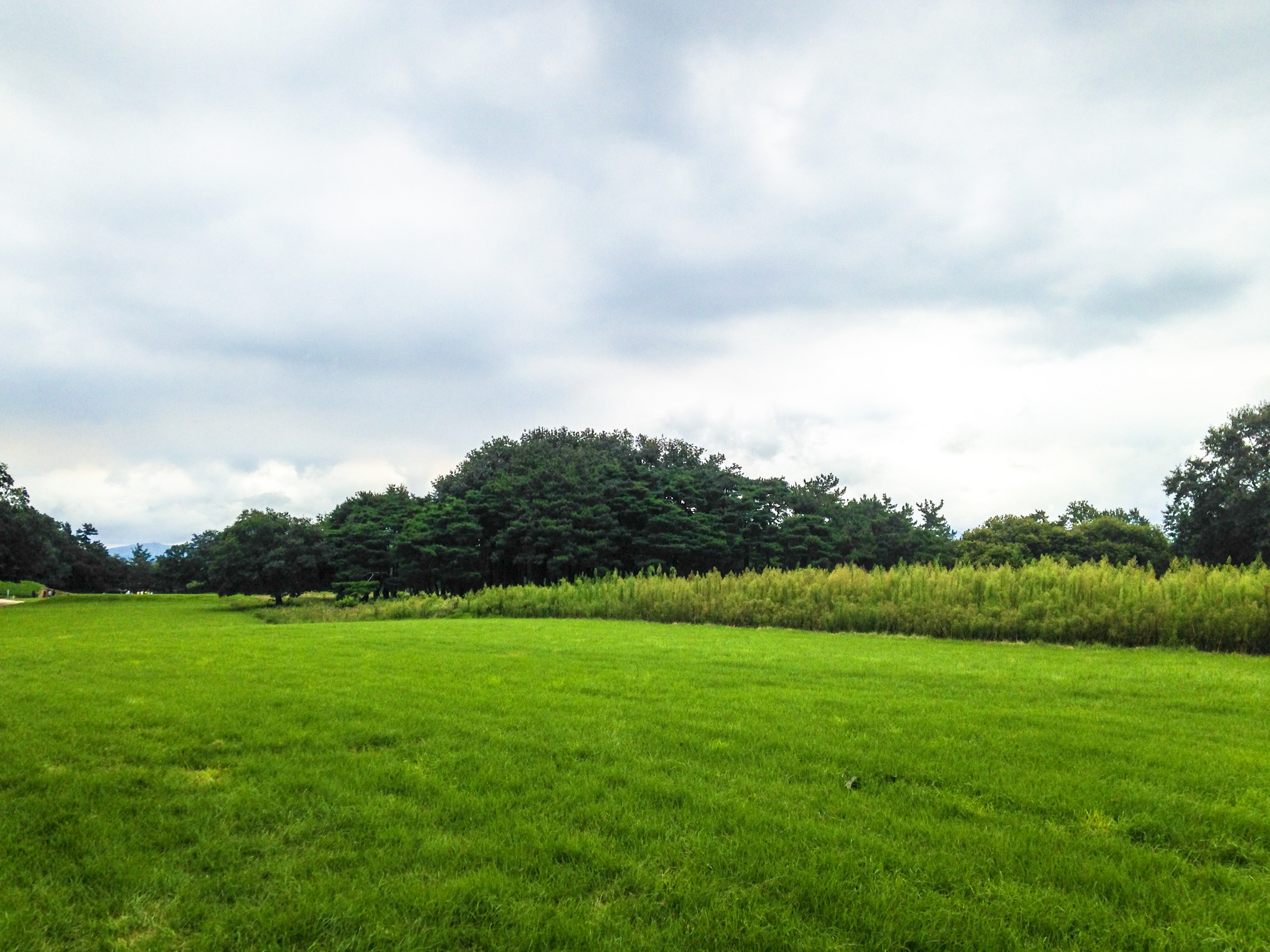
- A moat in the remains of the Wolseong Palace (2014)

General information
- Location: Gyeongju, South Korea
- Coordinates: 35°49′52.73″N 129°13′24.01″E

Design and construction
- Designations

UNESCO World Heritage Site
- Designated: 2000
- Part of: Gyeongju Historic Areas

Historic Sites of South Korea
- Official name: Wolseong Palace Site, Gyeongju
- Designated: 1963-01-21
- Reference no.: 16

Korean name
- Hangul: 월성
- Hanja: 月城
- RR: Wolseong
- MR: Wŏlsŏng

Wolseong (Korean: 월성; Hanja: 月城; lit. 'moon fortress') or Wolseong Palace was a royal palace of Silla. It was located in what is now Gyeongju, South Korea. The palace was used during the Silla and Unified Silla periods (57 BCE – 938 CE). The palace gets its names from the approximate outline of the palace walls, which were shaped like a crescent moon. It is also called Banwolseong (반월성; lit. 'crescent moon fortress') or Sinwolseong or Jaeseong, which means where the king resides.

== Features ==
Today the ruins of the palace, set among lush forests and hills, can still be visited and is part of the Gyeongju Historic Areas, a UNESCO World Heritage site. The South Korean government has also designated the palace ruins as Historic Site No. 16. Other notable sites nearby include the Anapji Pond which is northwest of the ruins and Gyeongju National Museum.

According to the Samguk Sagi, the fortress was built by King Pasa (4–24) to protect the royal palace. However, excavations done at the site in the second half of the 2010s and in 2021 reveal that it is more likely the palace was built in the 4th century. In September, archeologists also found human bodies and animal bones dating to the Silla dynasty buried at the main entrance, which indicates human sacrifice rituals may have been conducted to protect the construction. A 1500 years-old woman skeleton was pictured with a necklace, a bracelet and an earthen pot. The palace had many structures including the north and south gates, Guijeongmun, Hyeondeokmun, Mupyeongmun, Wolsangnu pavilion, Mangeunnu, and Goru. Jowonjeon was where the governmental affairs were discussed. Namcheon River flows along the south wall and provided a natural barrier of protection. The site of Imhaejeon Hall and other structures were also near the river.

According to legend, a man named Hogon lived on the site of the future fortress and was chased away by a youth Talhae who had magical powers. King Namhae, impressed by the story, took Talhae as his son-in-law. Talhae eventually became king.

Treasure No. 66, Seokbinggo, is a famous icehouse. It is 2.4 meters in width, 1.78 meters in height, and 18.8 meters in length. The entrance is located in the south and three ventilation ducts were built in the arched roof. The floor is angled in an incline so that melting ice water flows toward the floor. Originally the ice storehouse was in the west of Wolseong but has been moved to its present location near the northern castle turret. The icehouse was used during the Joseon dynasty. Records inscribed on stone state that Jo Myeonggyeom replaced the older wood ice storage house with one made of stone during the reign of King Yeongjo and then moved the icehouse to the west of Wolseong. The storage facility is considered important for its architectural technique and the magnitude of the structure.

The oldest icehouse in Korea was built in 505 under the reign of King Jijeung.

== Gallery ==
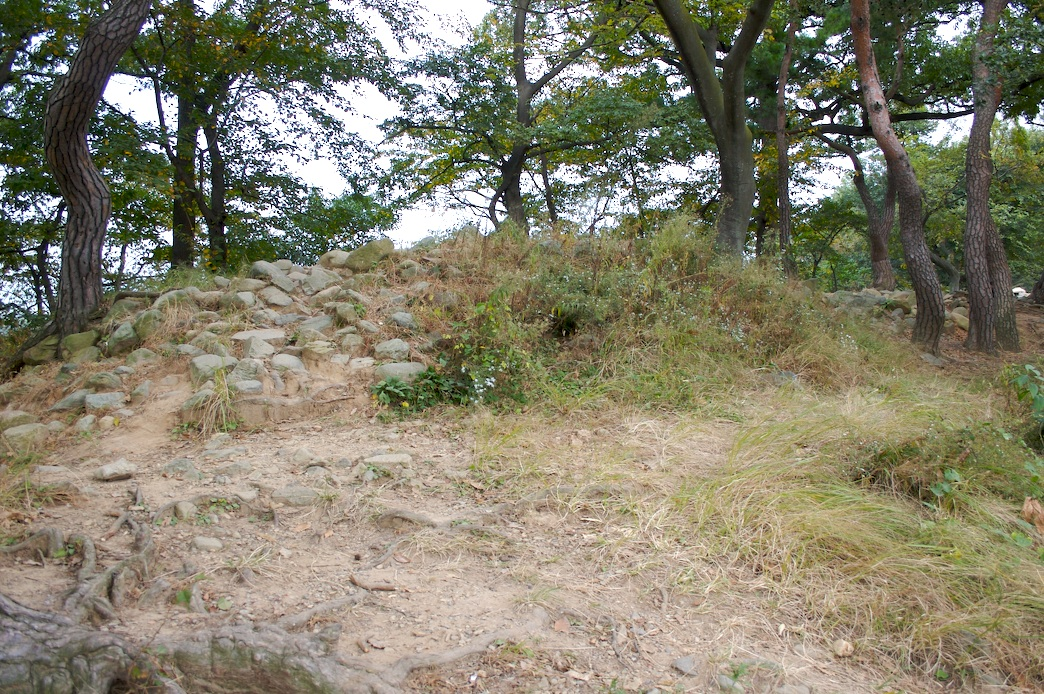
The ruins of the fortess wall

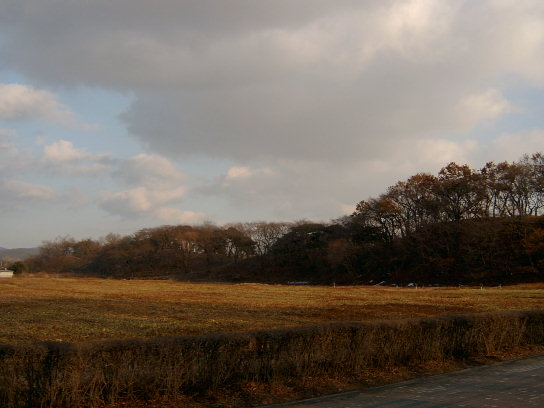
The ruins of the fortess wall.

== See also ==
- Silla
- Donggung Palace and Wolji Pond in Gyeongju
