= Donggung Palace and Wolji Pond =

Palace and pond in Gyeongju, South Korea

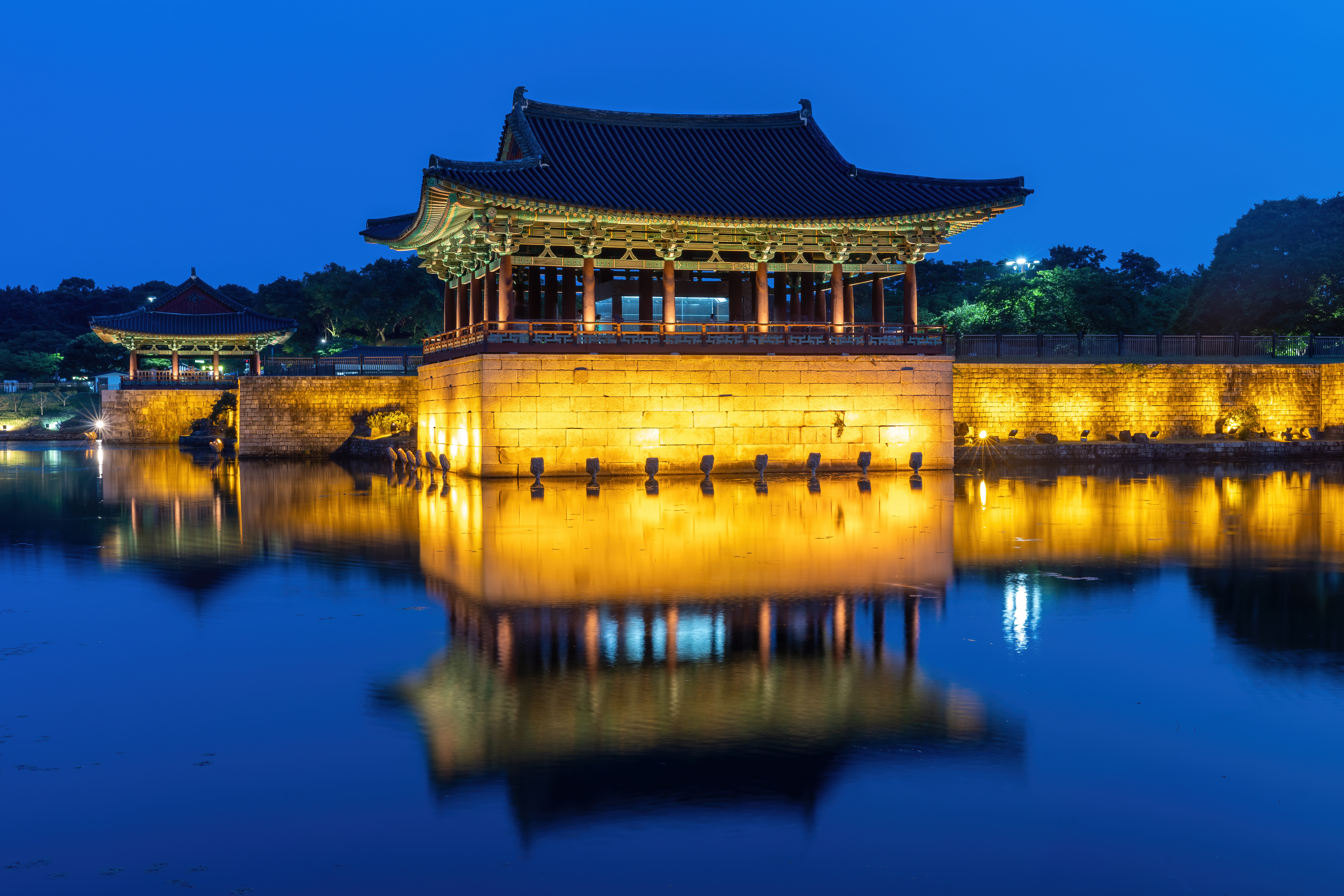
- Part of the palace and lake at night (2024)
- Interactive map of Donggung Palace and Wolji Pond
- 35°50′4.63″N 129°13′37.61″E
- Location: Gyeongju, South Korea

UNESCO World Heritage Site
- Criteria: ii, iii
- Designated: 2000
- Part of: Gyeongju Historic Areas

Historic Sites of South Korea
- Designated: 1963-01-21
- Reference no.: 18

Korean name
- Hangul: 동궁과 월지
- Hanja: 東宮과 月池
- RR: Donggunggwa Wolji
- MR: Tonggunggwa Wŏlchi

Donggung Palace and Wolji Pond (Korean: 동궁과 월지; Hanja: 東宮과 月池) are a Silla-era former palace and artificial pond in Gyeongju, South Korea. They were part of the palace complex of ancient Silla (57 BCE – 935 CE). It was constructed by order of King Munmu in 674 CE. The pond was formerly known as Anapji (안압지) and is situated at the northeast edge of the Wolseong Palace, in central Gyeongju. The pond is an oval shape; 200m from east to west and 180m from north to south. It contains three small islands.

== History ==
Anapji was originally located near the palace of Silla called Banwolseong. It is written in Samguk Sagi: "During the era of King Munmu, a new pond was made in the palace and flowers and birds flourished in this pond". There is also mention of a royal reception held by King Gyeongsun in 931, when Silla was already crumbling. After the fall of Silla, the pond fell into disrepair for many centuries. The name Anapji appears in the 16th century Joseon era document Augmented Survey of the Geography of Korea (동국여지승람; 東國輿地勝覽) with the explanation that King Munmu made the pond with Taoist aesthetics.

== Renovation and excavation of relics ==
As part of the renovation project of historic sites in Gyeongju, Anapji was dredged and rebuilt in 1974. The long-term excavation project from March 1975 to December 1986 released a large number of relics from the pond. Research revealed that the pond had been surrounded by stone walls, and that 5 buildings had been standing on the pond's west to south sides. Waterway systems were also detected. Almost 33,000 pieces of historic relics were excavated from the site. An abundance of unique and extraordinarily designed roof tiles, architectural materials, pottery, gilt bronze figures of Buddha, jewelry, accessories and other everyday items were discovered, offering an insight to Buddhist art and everyday life in Silla. Gyeongju city government tried to work on restoration project once again in 2018 but it was suspended because UNESCO opposed the project.

== Tourist destination ==
Anapji is currently allotted in Inwang-dong, Gyeongju and is part of Gyeongju National Park. Approximately 730 relics are on display at the Anapji Exhibition Hall, the special gallery of the Gyeongju National Museum. The site of Imhaejeon is also a part of the grounds, the most important building on the property and the structure used as the crown prince's palace. While some sites have been restored others have been left in the natural form.

== Gallery ==
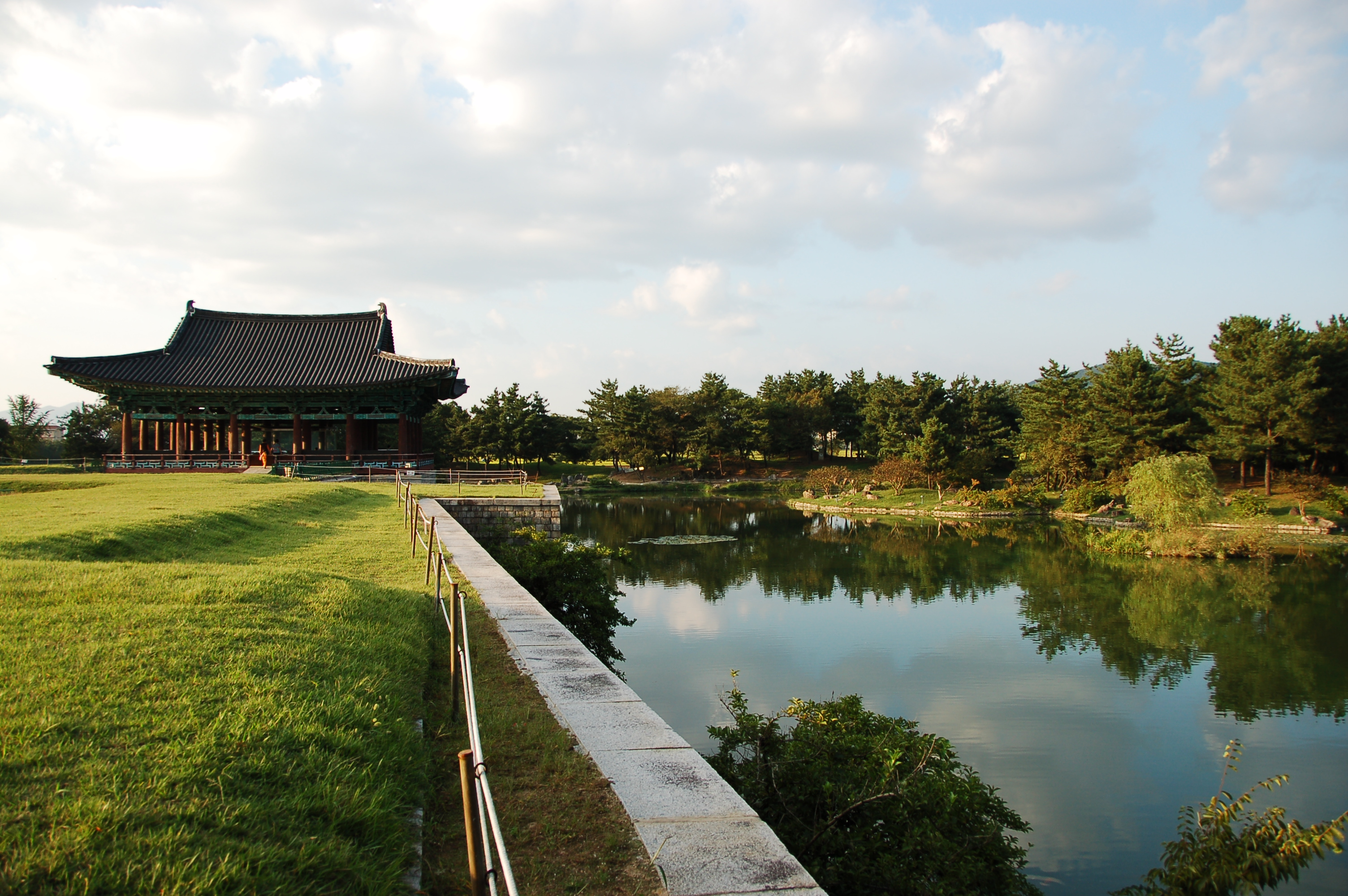

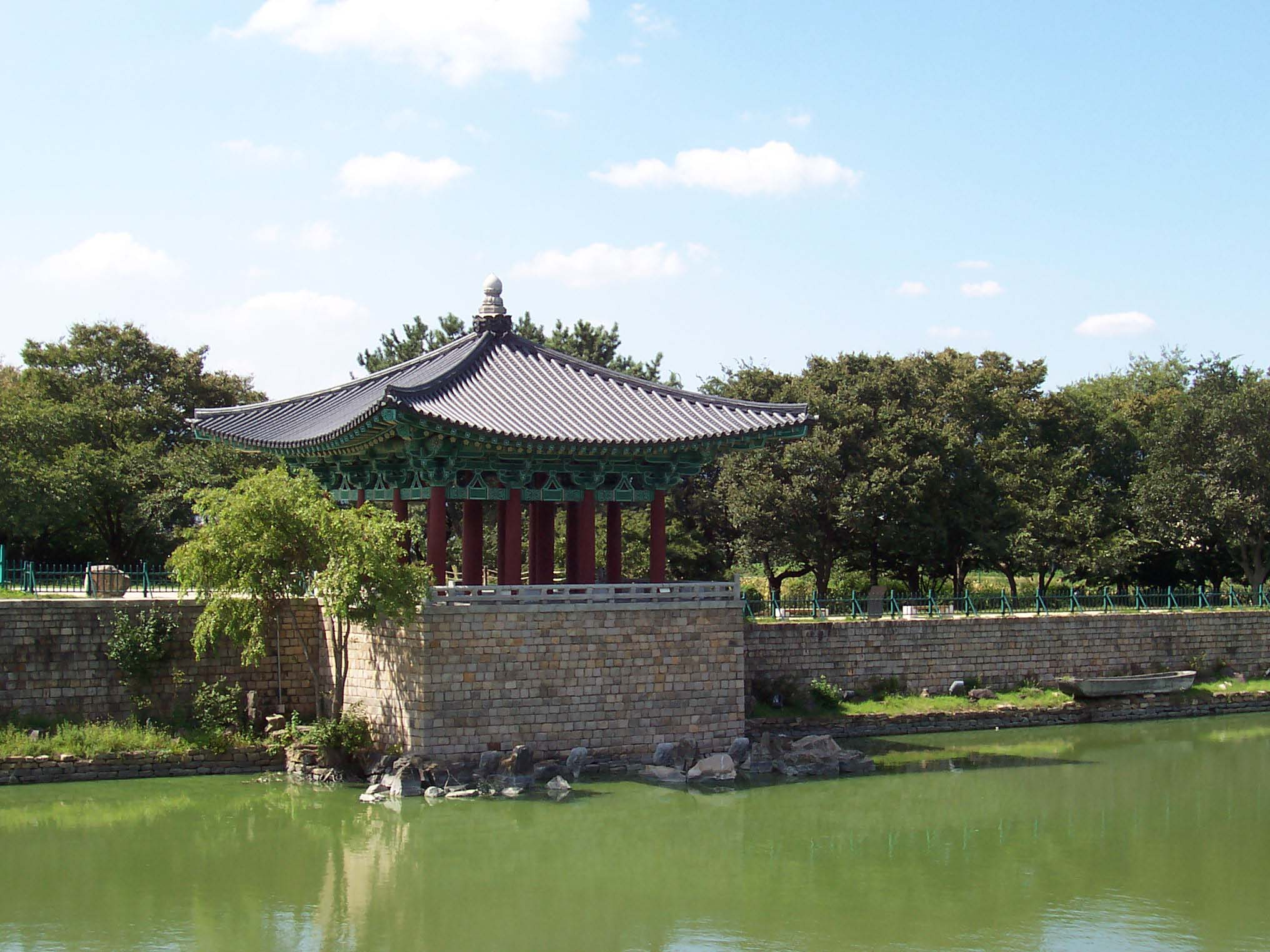

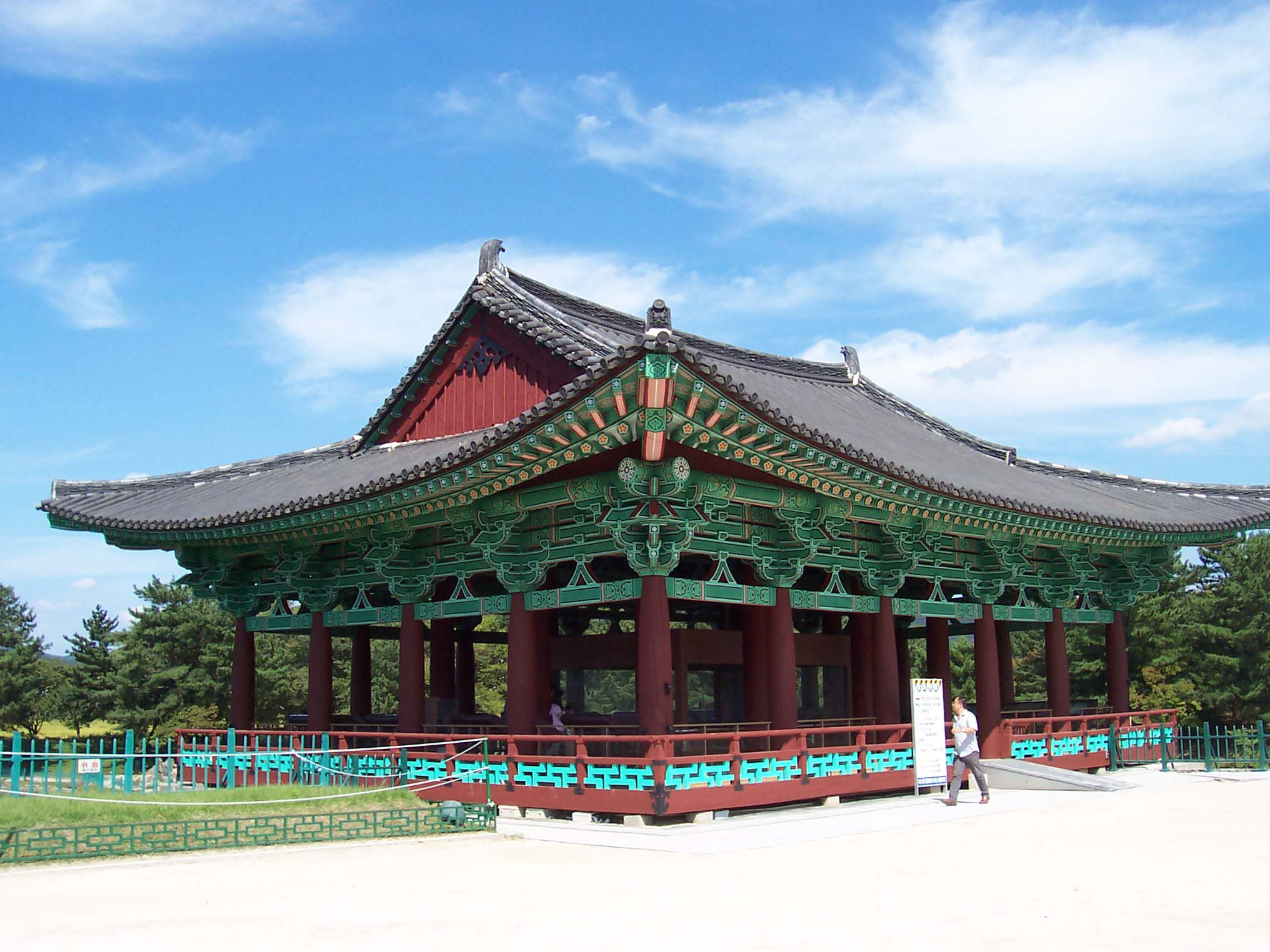

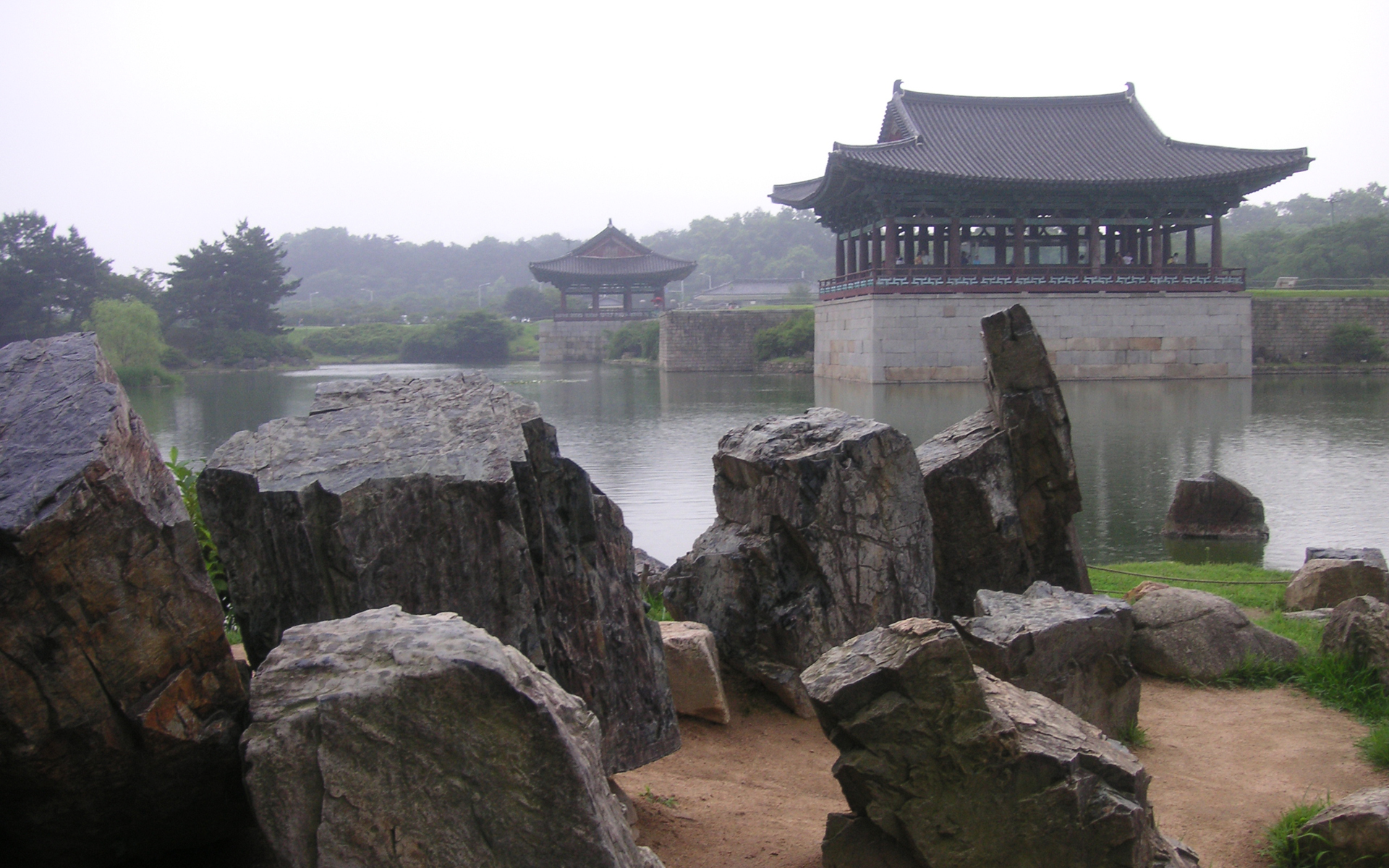
Anap Pond facing the Banwolseong palace site

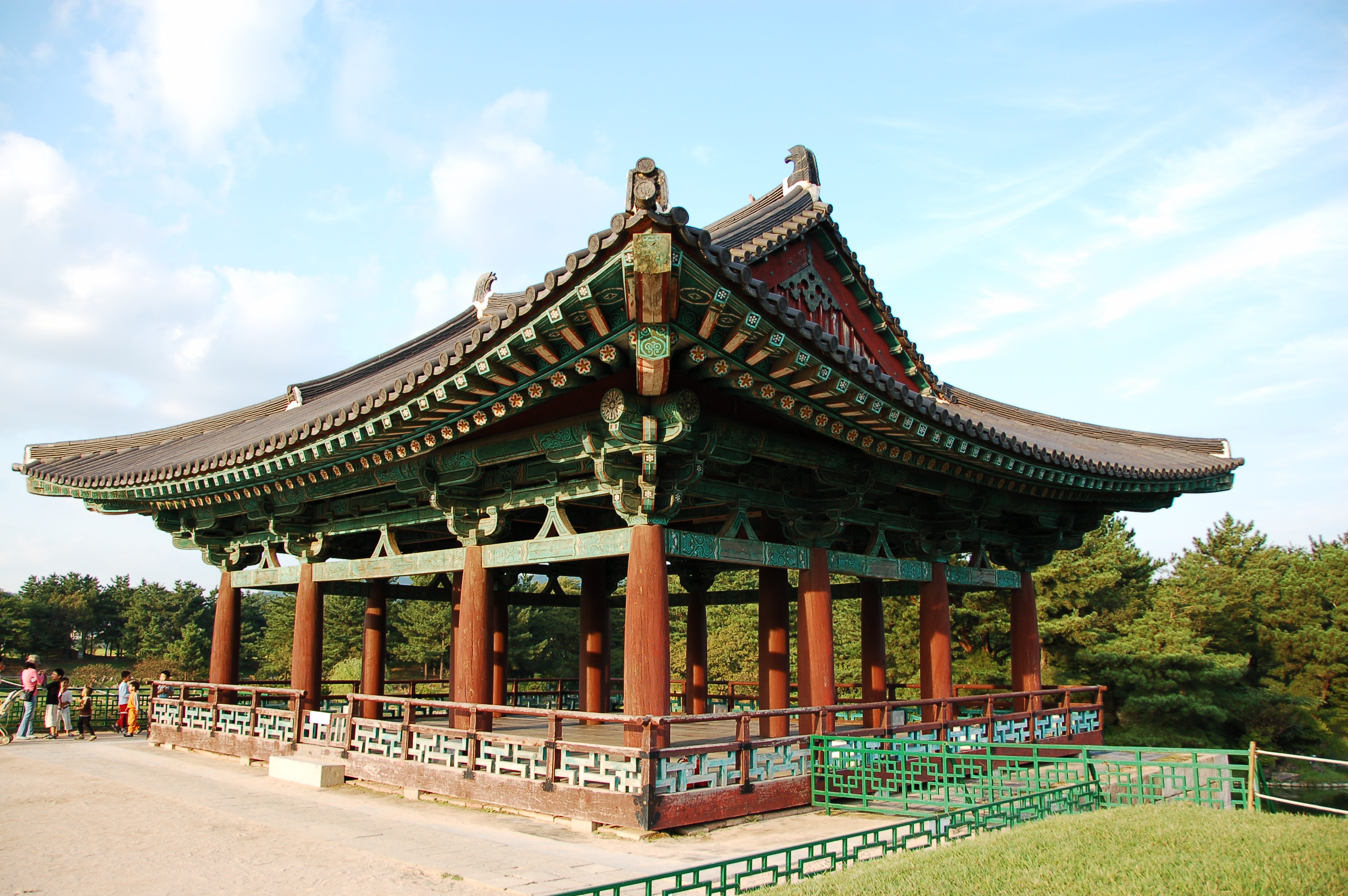
A reconstructed pavilion at Anapji lake.

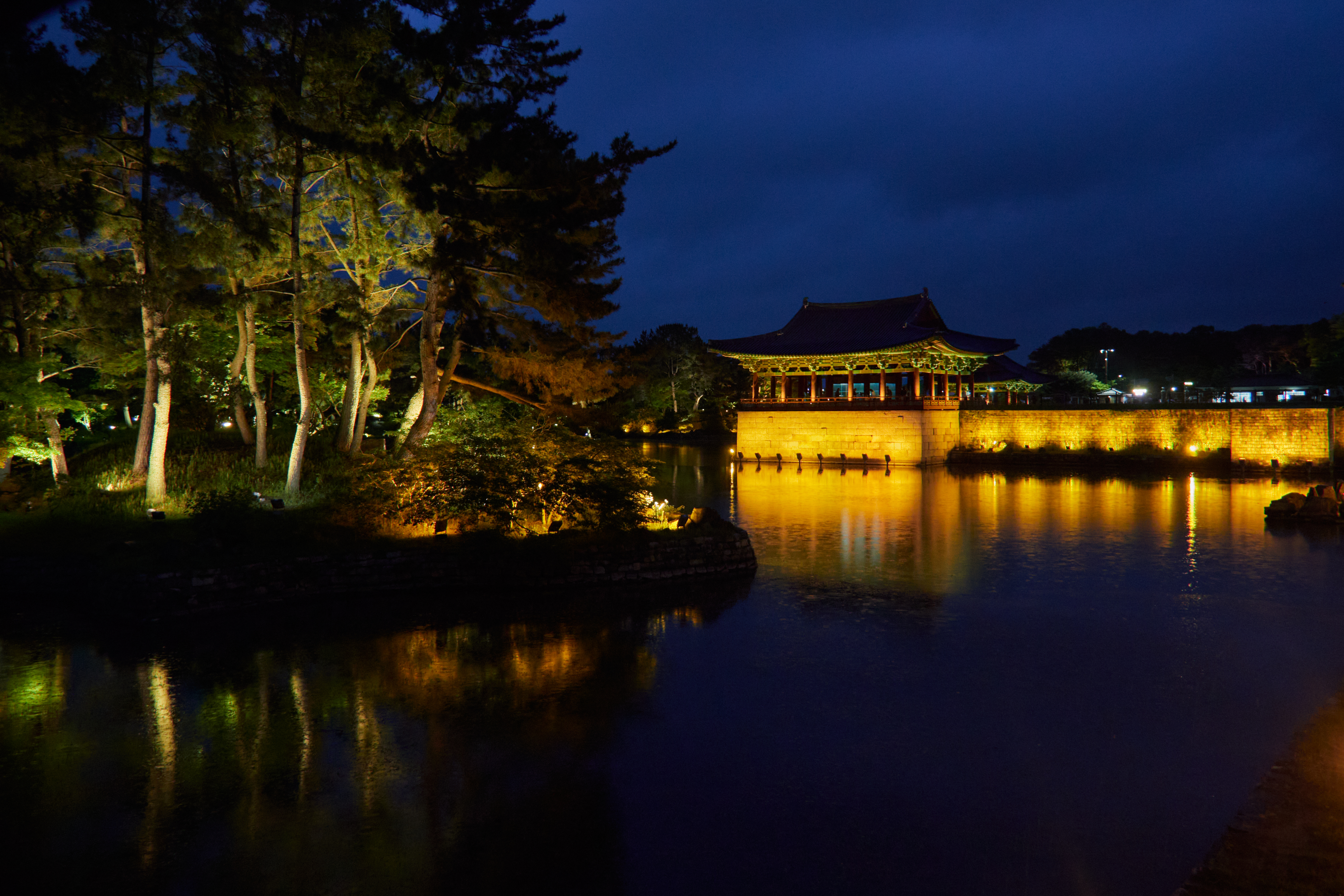
Donggung Palace and Wolji Pond illuminated at night.

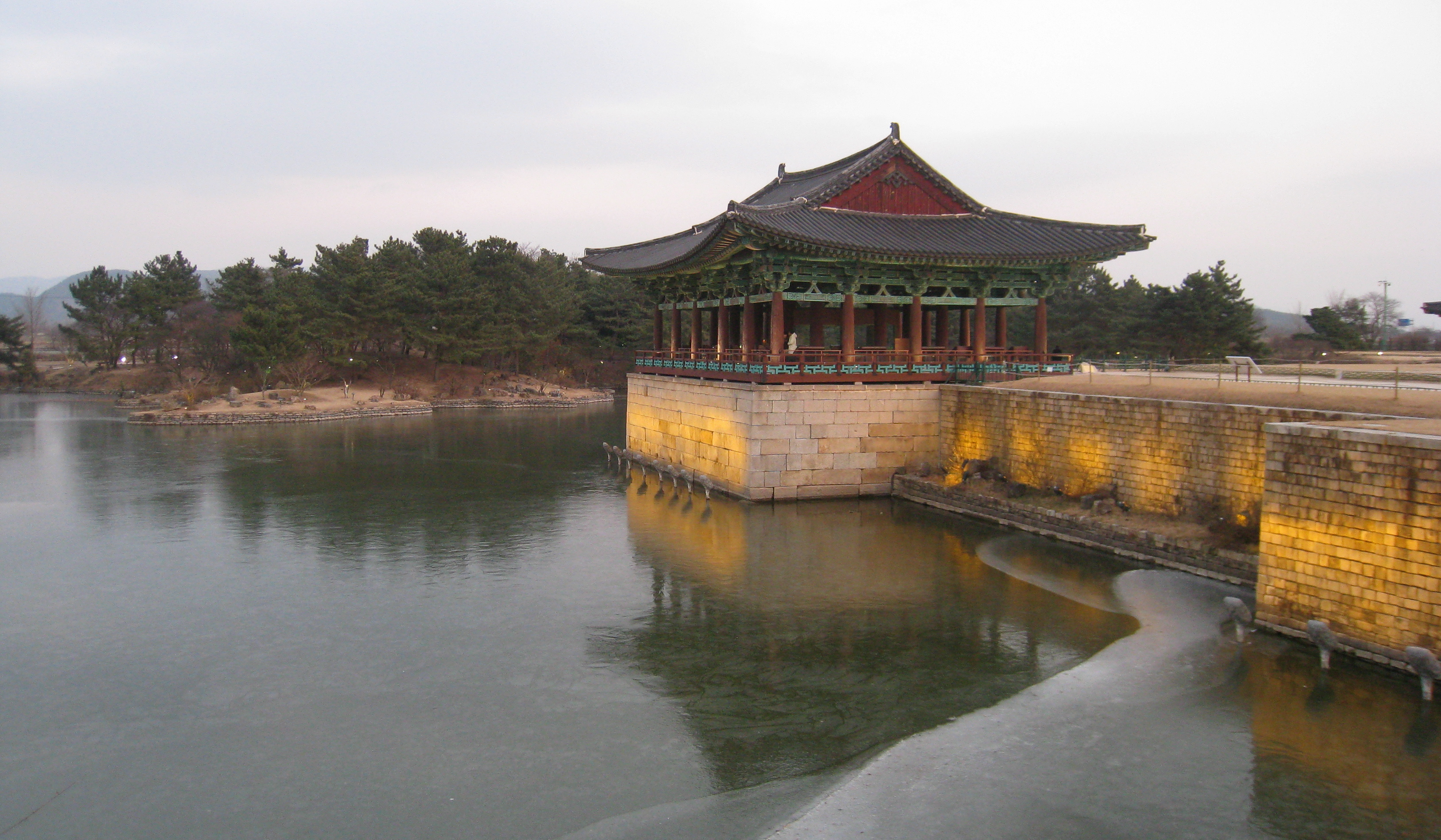

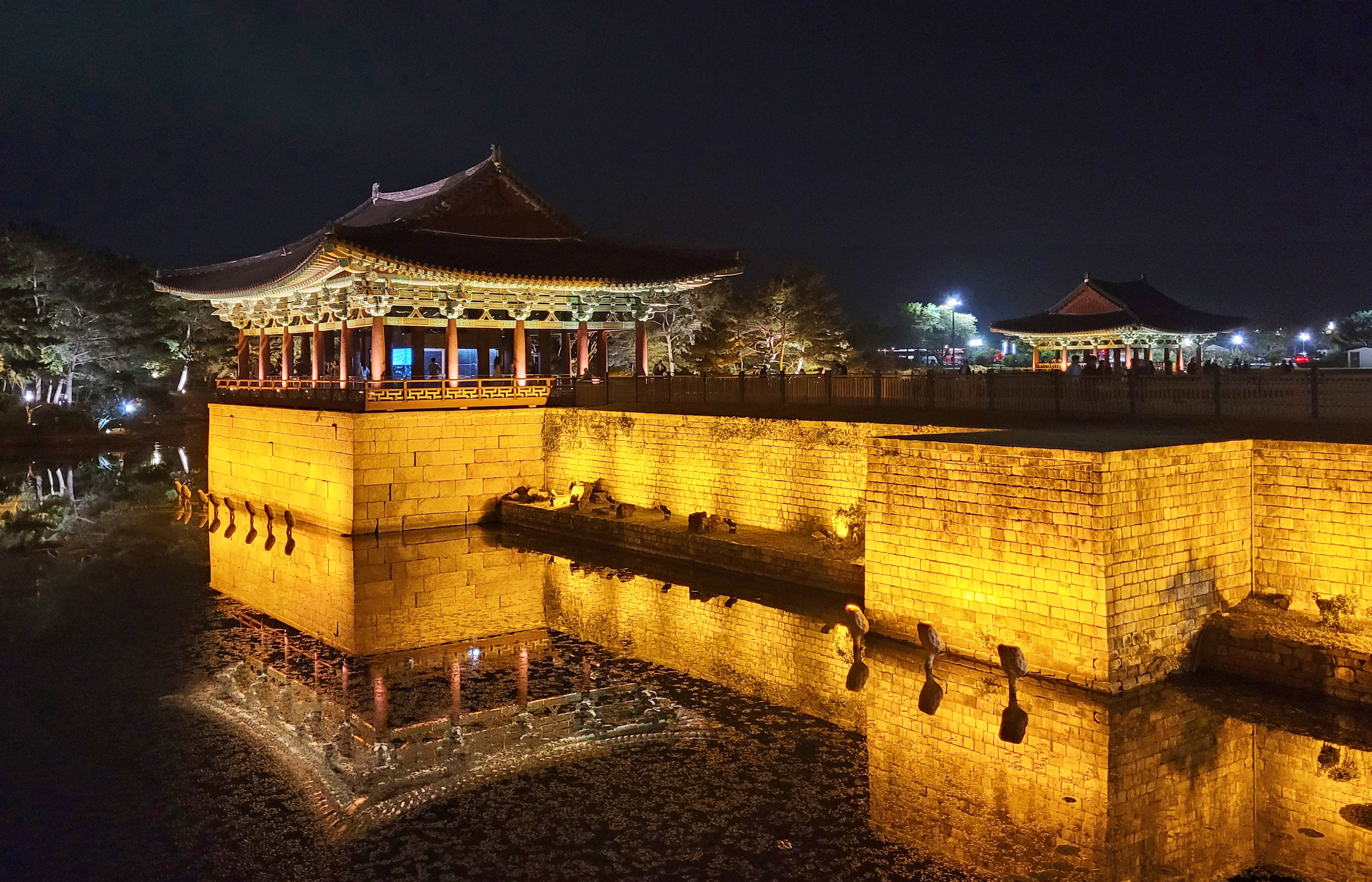
Anapji at night

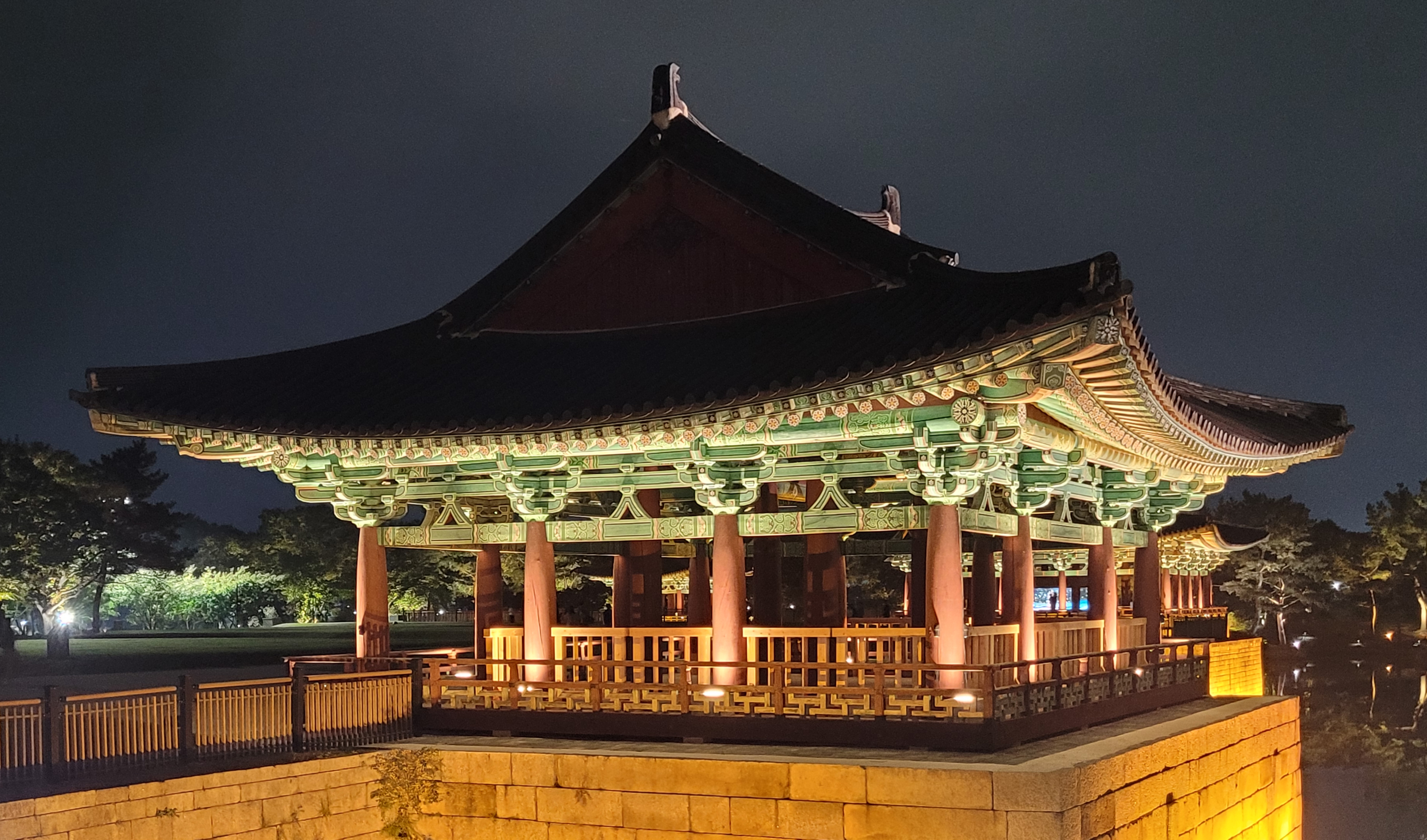
Anapji at night

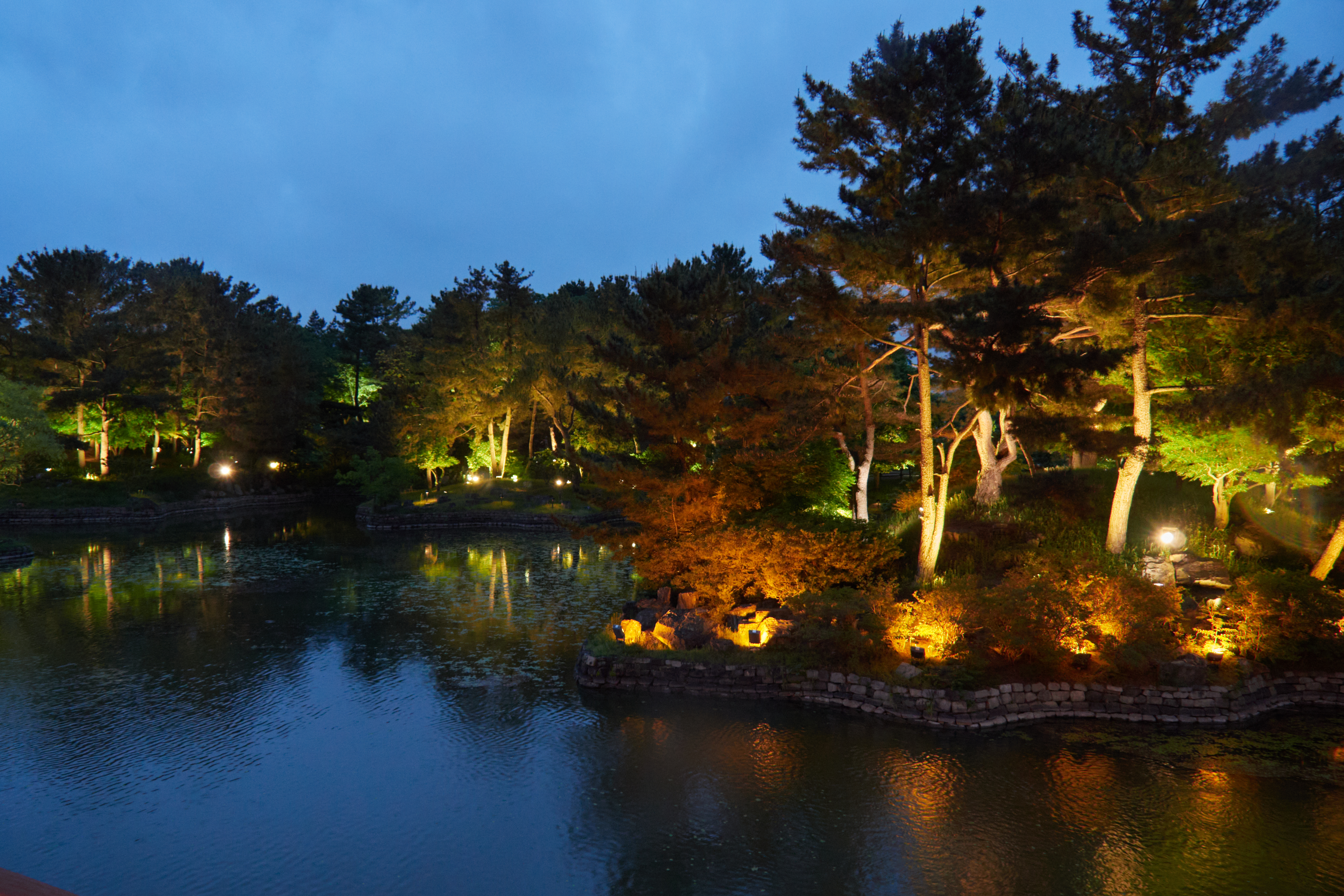
Wolji Pond at Donggung Palace, illuminated by landscape lighting at dusk.

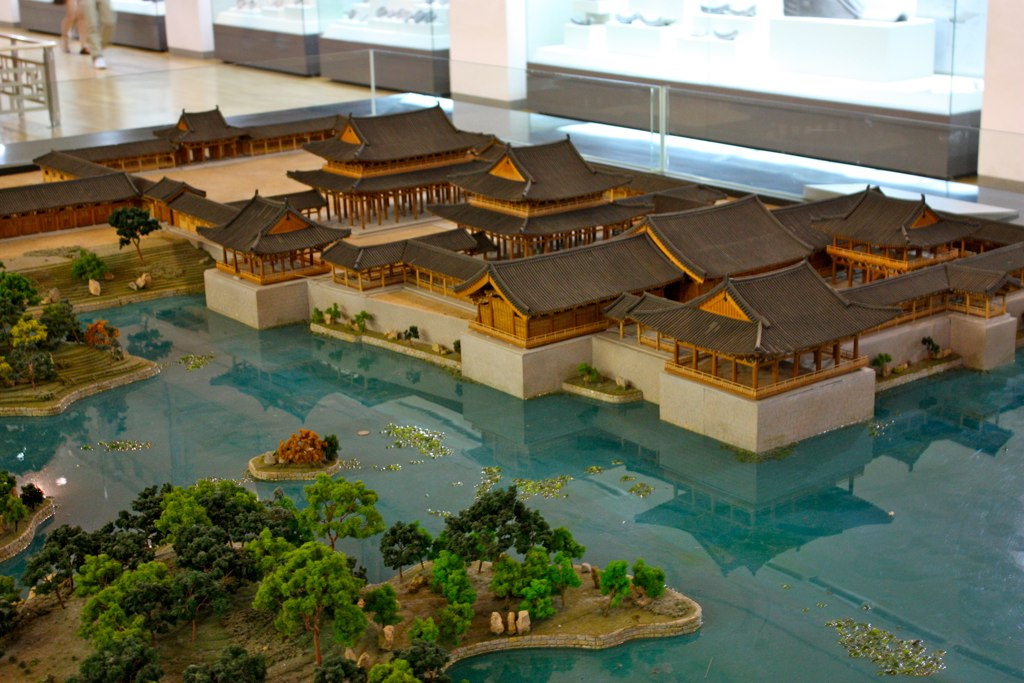
Model reconstruction of the Anapji Pond royal complex.

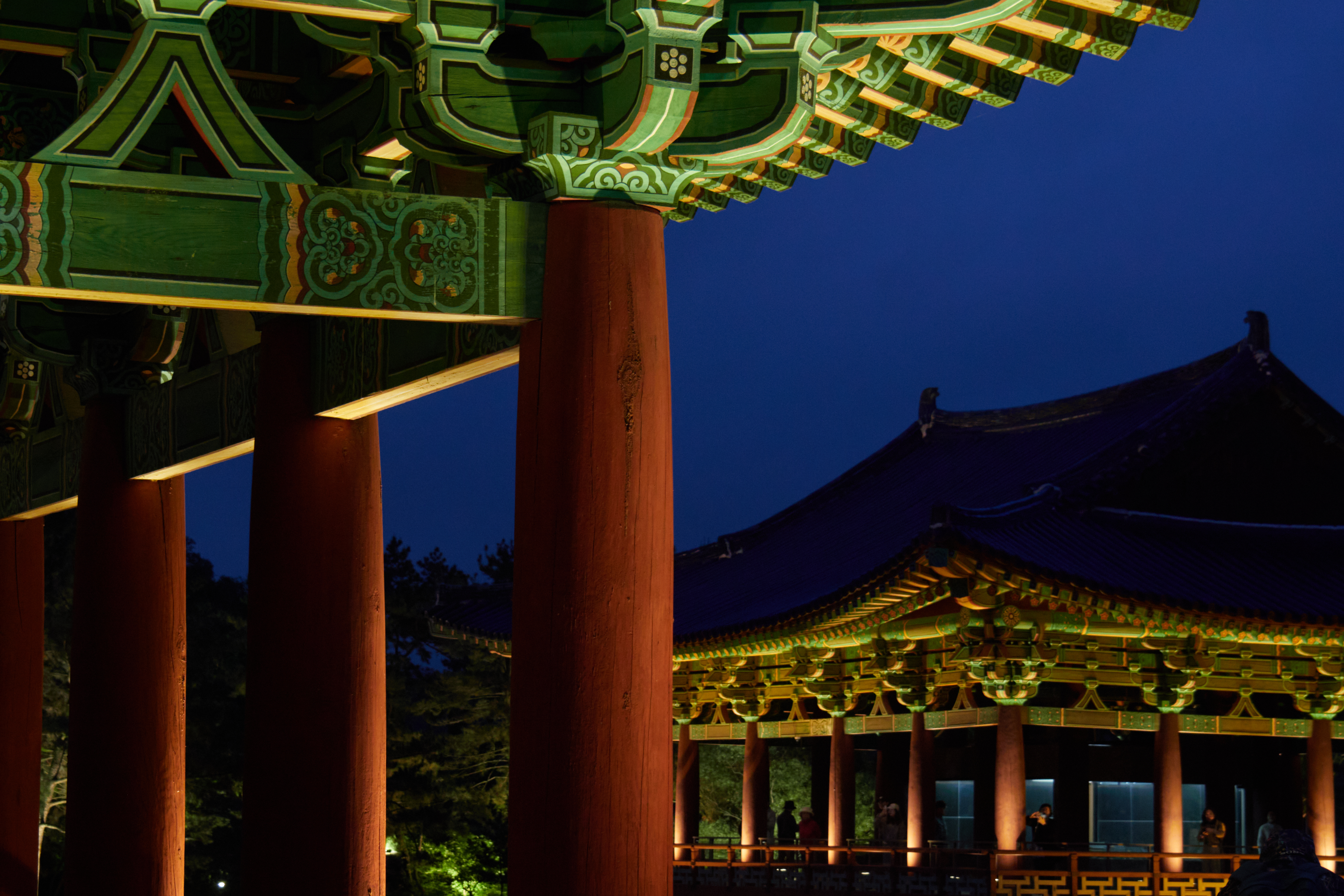
Traditional Korean dancheong painted eaves and red wooden columns.

== See also ==
- Silla
- List of South Korean tourist attractions
- History of Korea
- Banwolseong
