= Gyeongju National Museum =

National museum in South Korea

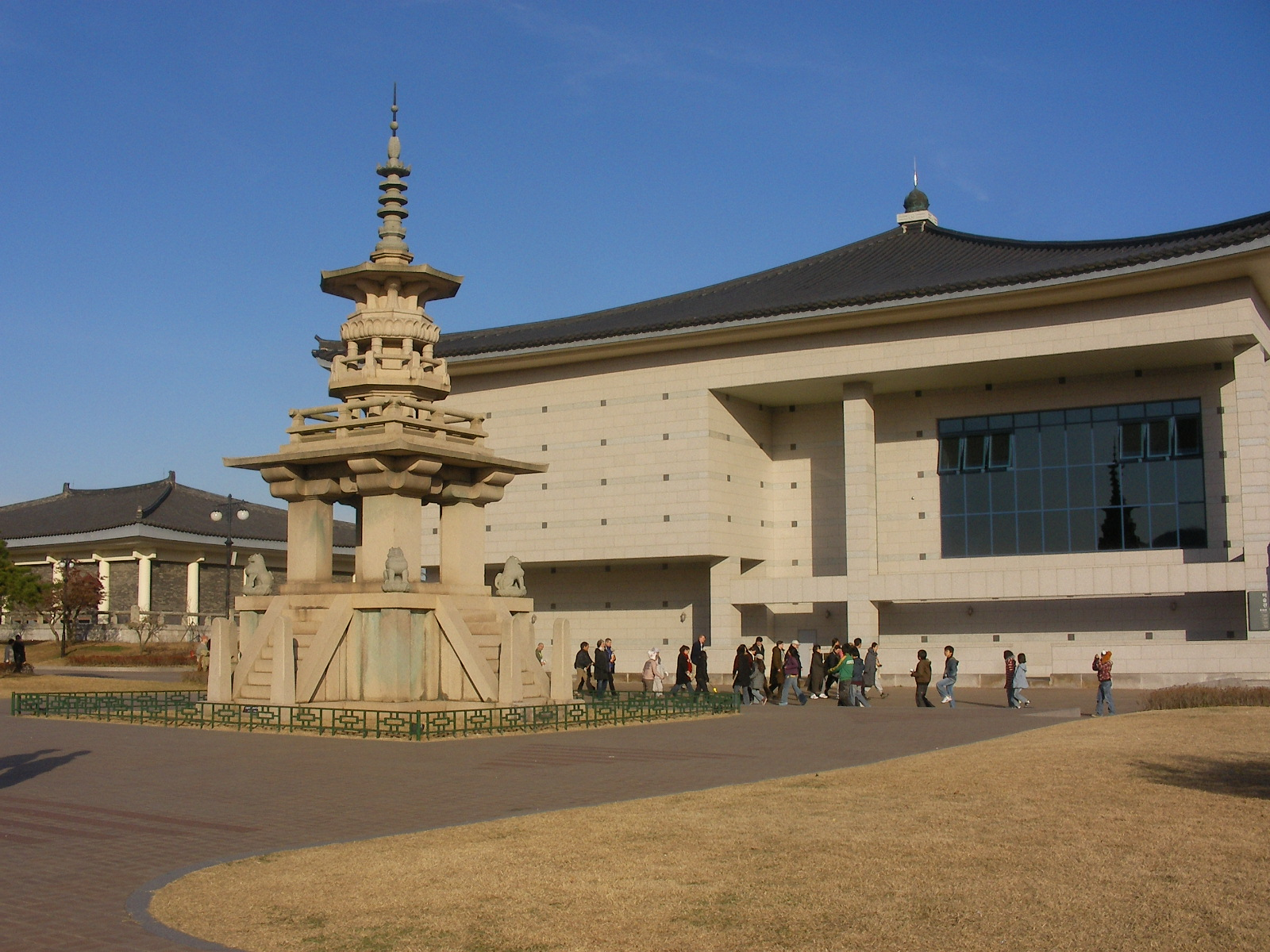
- Front of the museum (2007)
- Established: 1945
- Location: Gyeongju, South Korea
- Coordinates: 35°49′44.34″N 129°13′42.1″E
- Website: gyeongju.museum.go.kr/eng/

Korean name
- Hangul: 국립경주박물관
- Hanja: 國立慶州博物館
- RR: Gungnip Gyeongju bangmulgwan
- MR: Kungnip Kyŏngju pangmulgwan

The Gyeongju National Museum (Korean: 국립경주박물관) is a museum in Gyeongju, South Korea. Its holdings are largely devoted to relics of the Silla kingdom, of which Gyeongju was the capital.

The museum is located immediately adjacent to the royal tomb complex, in an area which also includes the Gyerim forest, Cheomseongdae observatory, Banwolseong palace, and Anapji Pond.

== History ==
The museum was first founded in 1945 as the Gyeongju Branch of National Museum of Korea. The main building of the museum was built in 1968. The museum was upgraded as "Gyeongju National Museum" in 1975 and has been under expansion since then.

== Collections ==
There are a number of national museums in key locations across Korea, but the collection of this museum is especially important because it allows the general public, archaeologists, and historians to understand the rise of civilization in southeast Korea. The museum contains important items of national cultural heritage. They include the Emille Bell, which is said to ring with the sound of a child who was sacrificed for its casting. There are several Silla crowns in the museum's collection. The museum also holds many artifacts excavated from Anapji Pond and artifacts excavated from the Hwangnyongsa Temple site. Many holdings are displayed outdoors, a common practice in Korean museums.

The volume of archaeological and historical artifacts in the collection of the Gyeongju National Museum is so large that most of the objects cannot be displayed and are thus stored out of the view of the general public. The Gyeongju National Museum has maintained an archaeological research department for decades, and staff there have conducted numerous field surveys and excavations in North Gyeongsang Province. This role has lessened with the onset of government-funded 'buried cultural heritage research centres' (ko:매장문화재조사연구소) across Korea since the mid-1990s. However, the role of the museum as a centre of cultural heritage conservation was enhanced when the Korean government built a large warehouse on the museum site in the early 2000s to house the mountains of archaeological material unearthed continuously from Gyeongju and across North Gyeongsang Province.

== Gallery ==
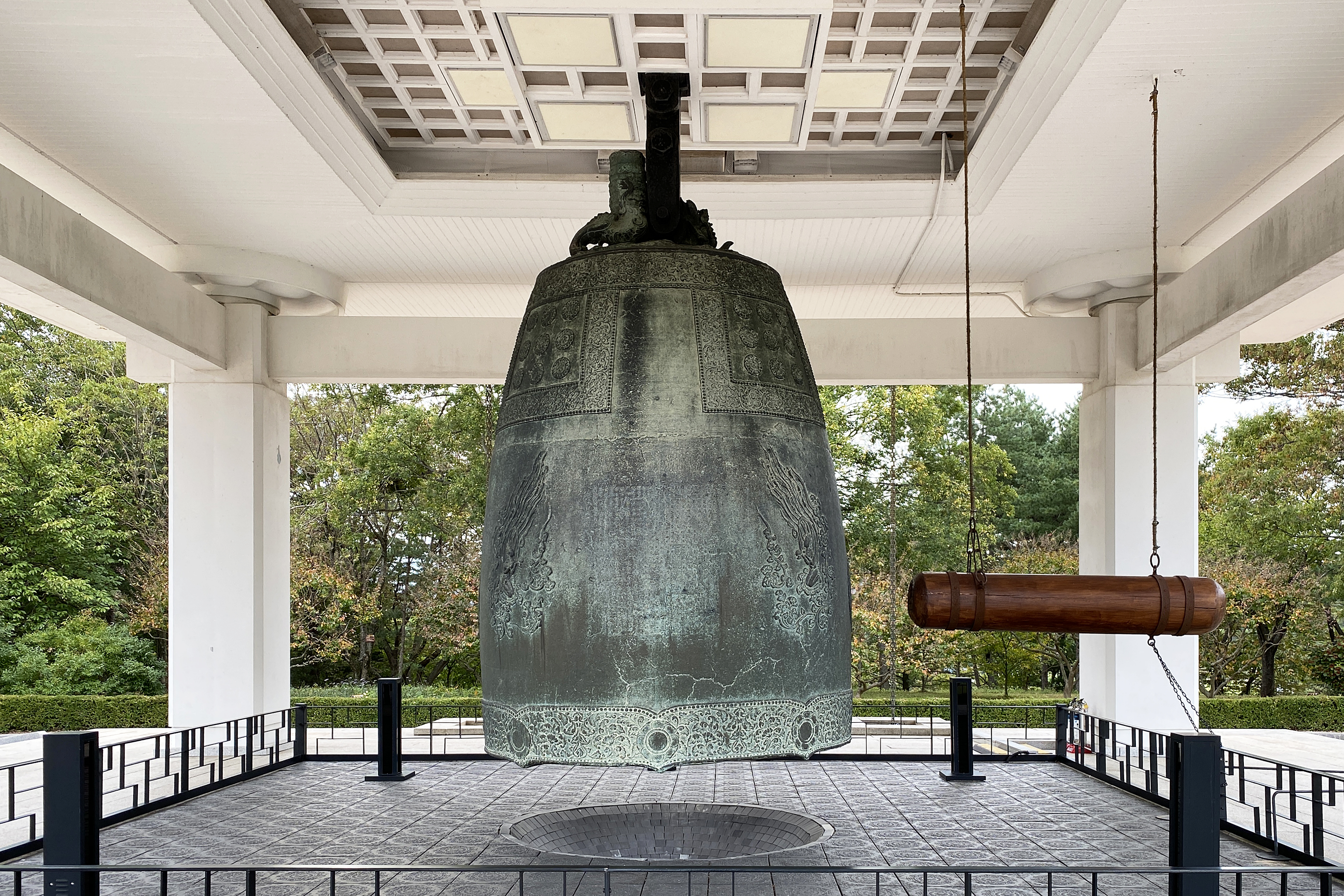
Emille Bell

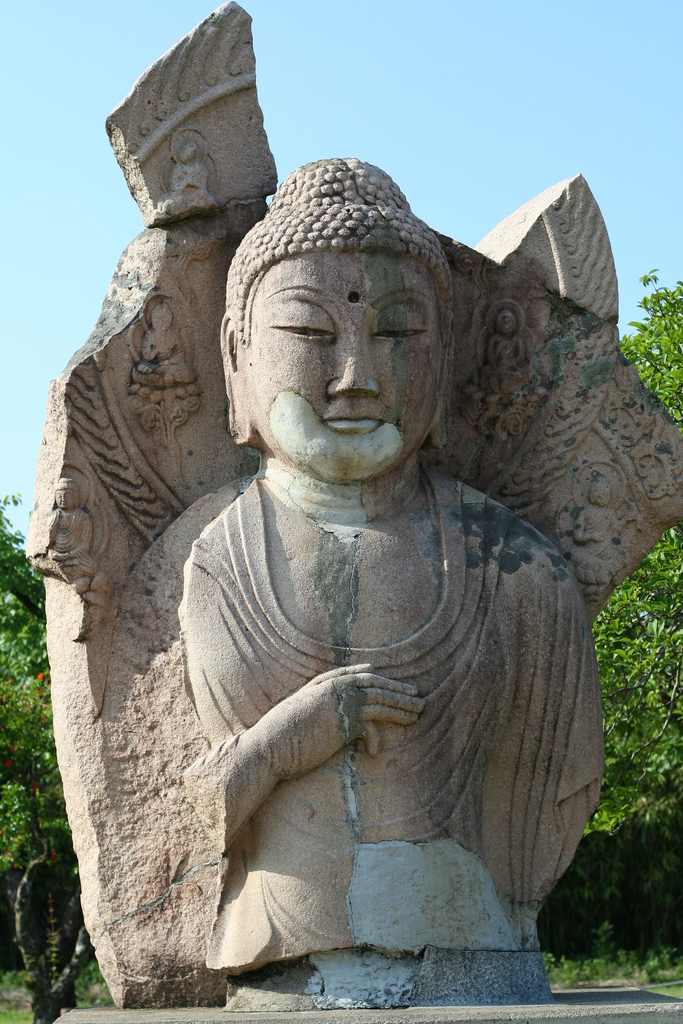

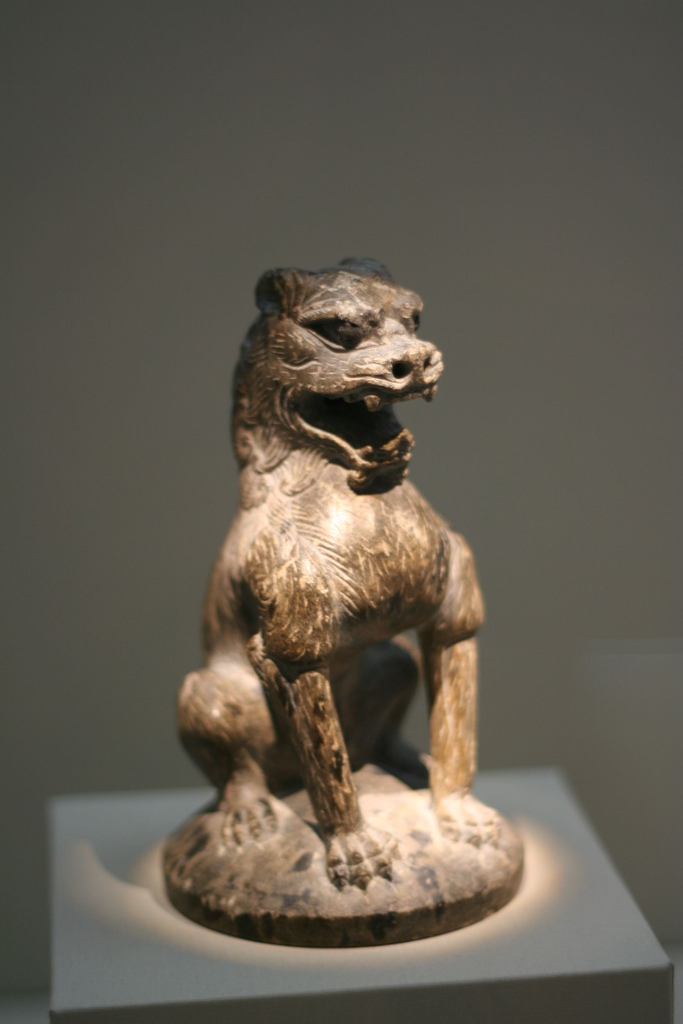

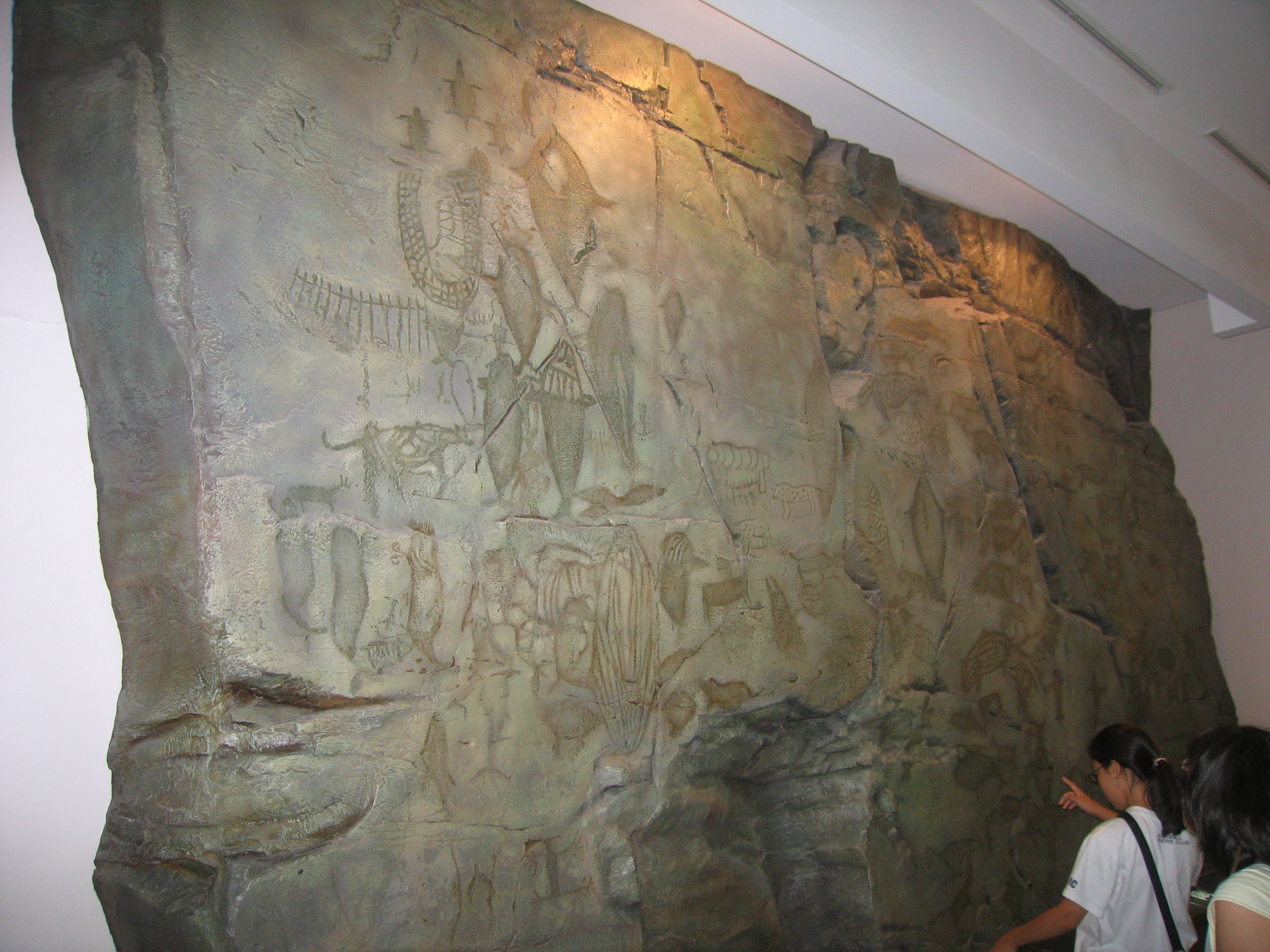
Bangudae Petroglyphs

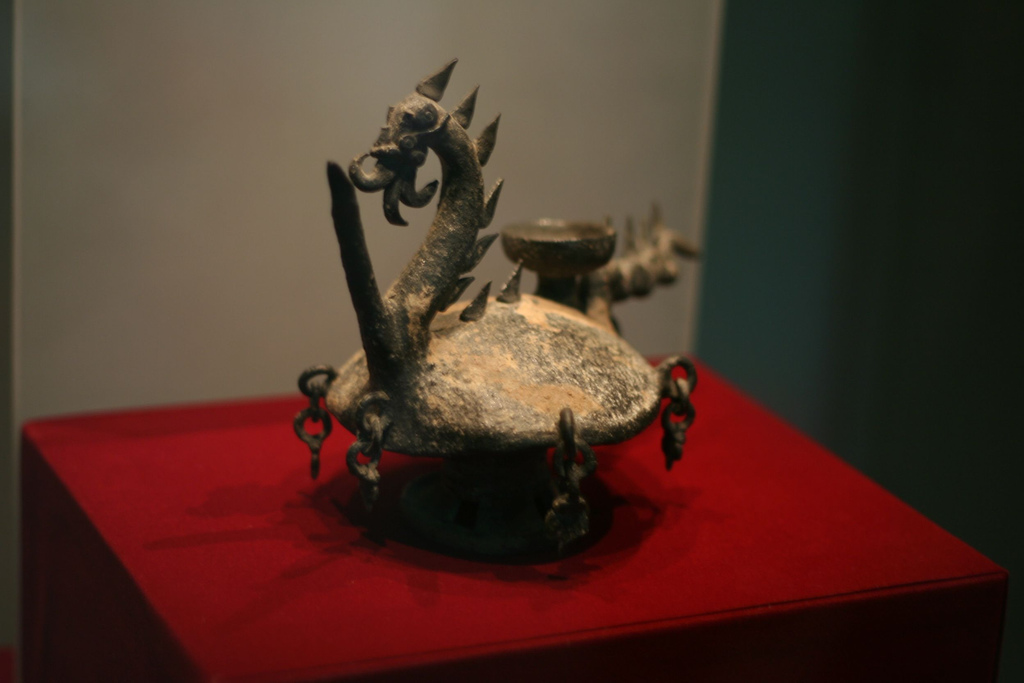

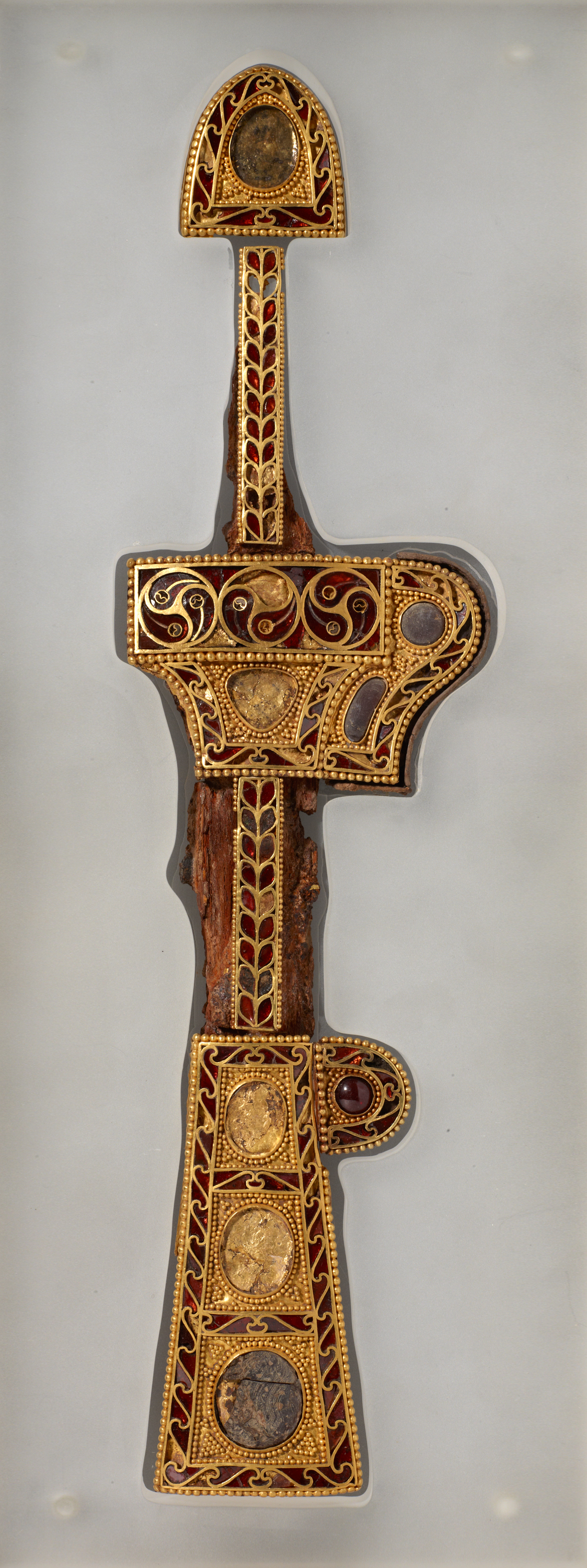
Ornamented Sword from Gyerim-ro, Gyeongju

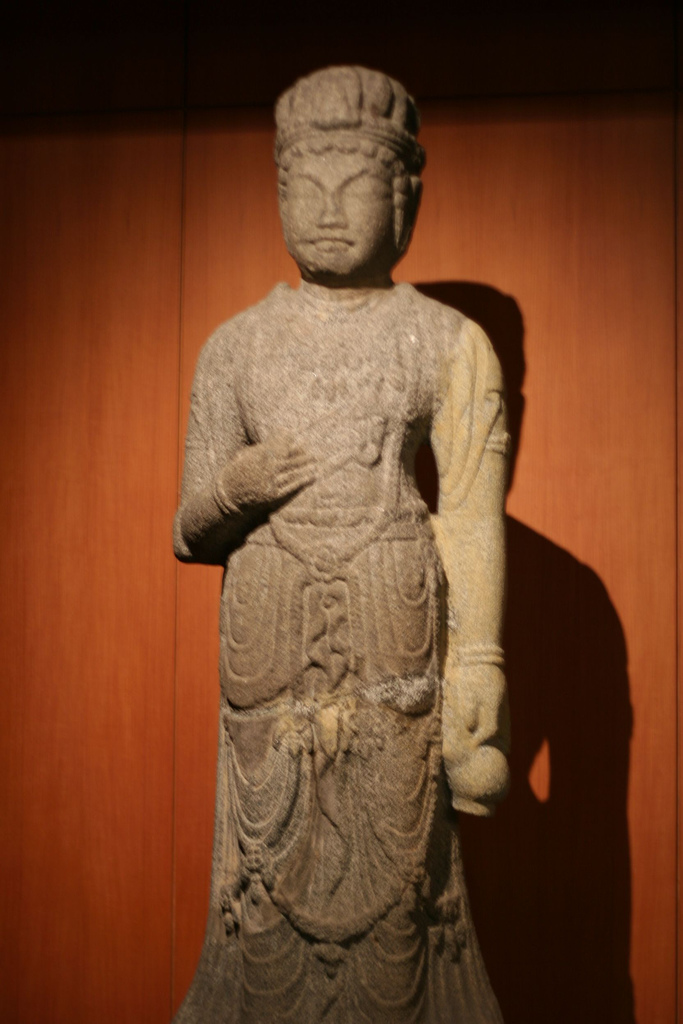

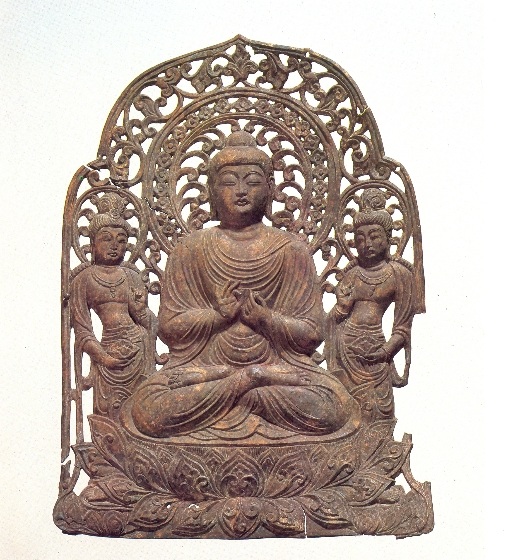

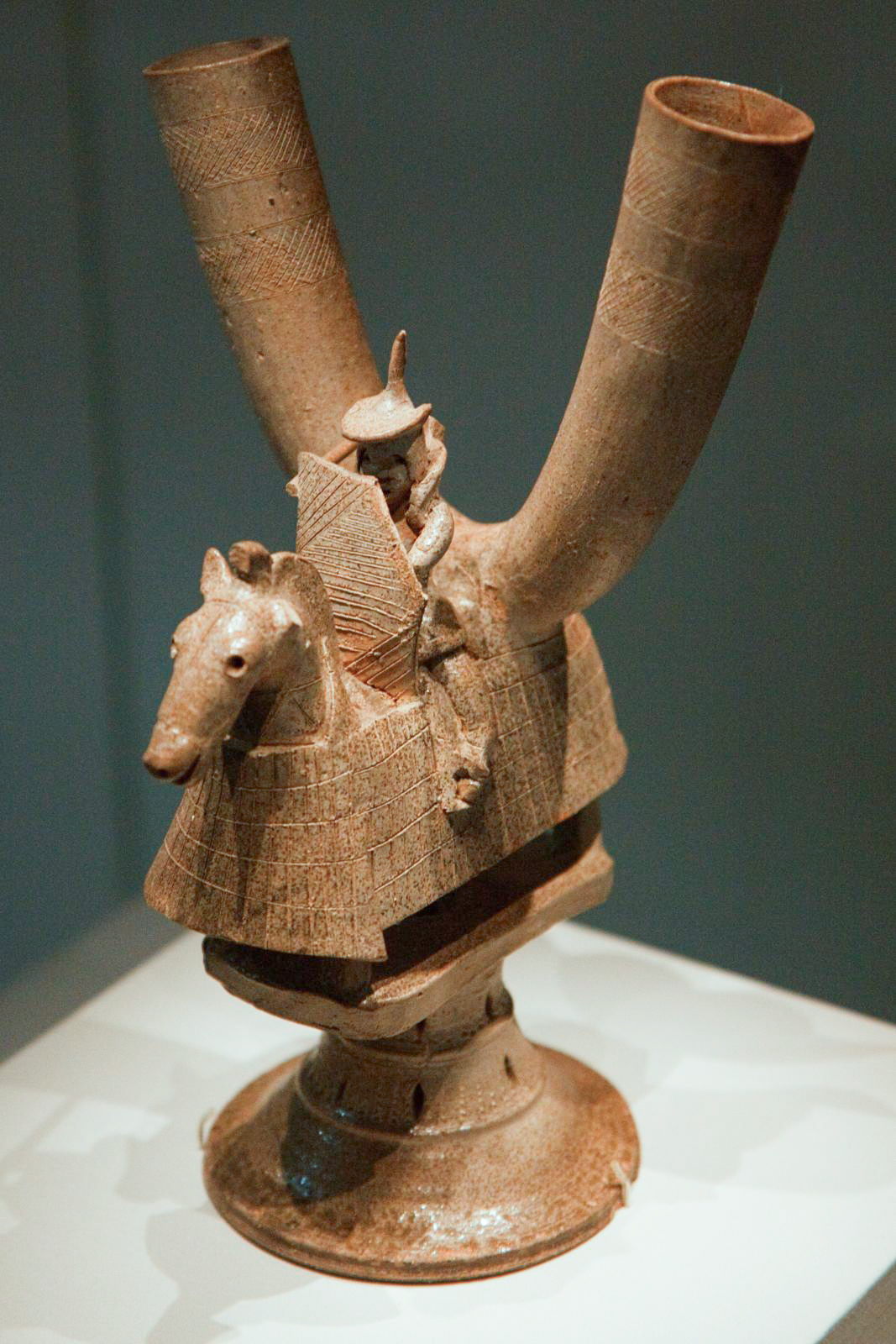

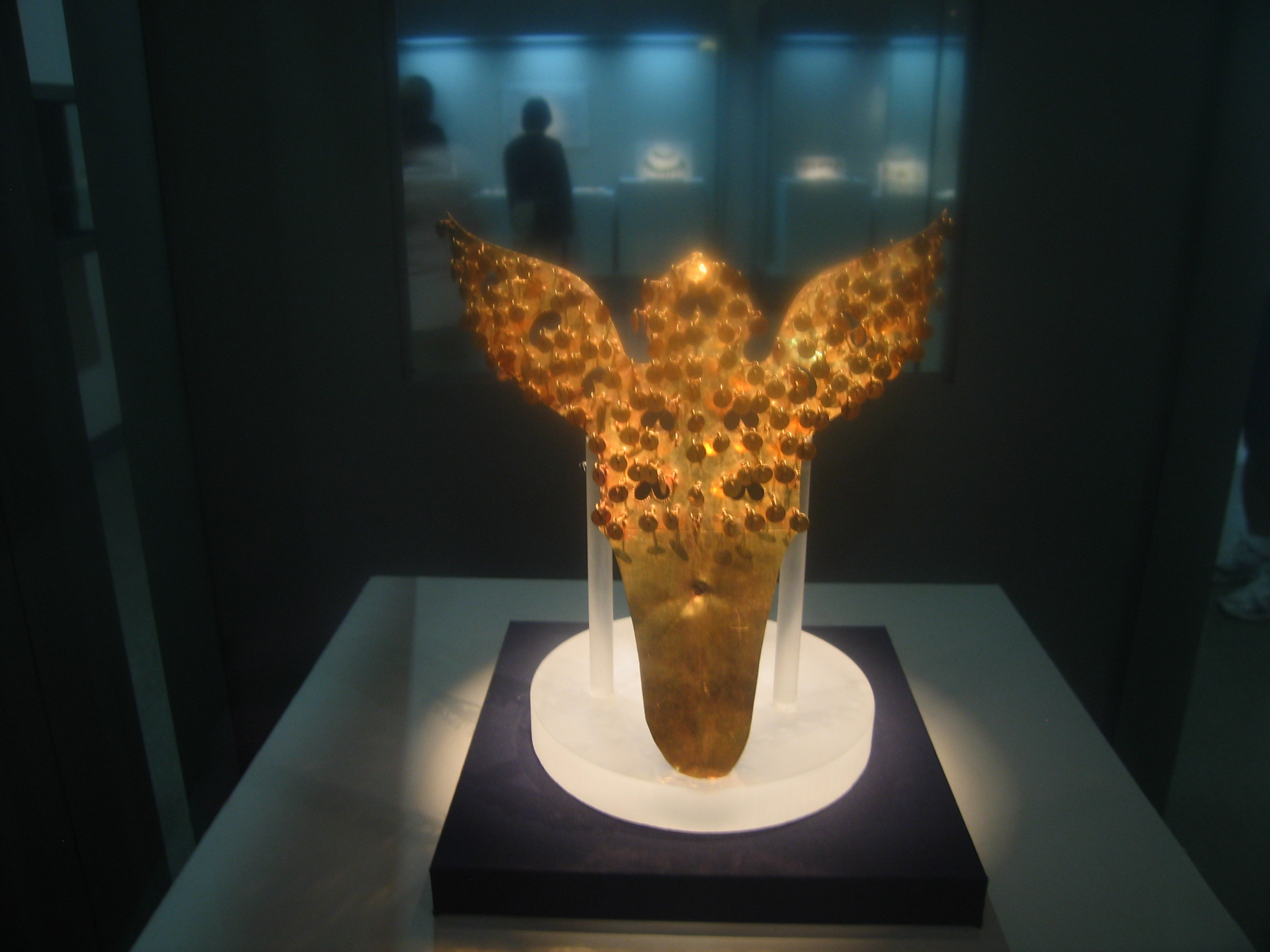

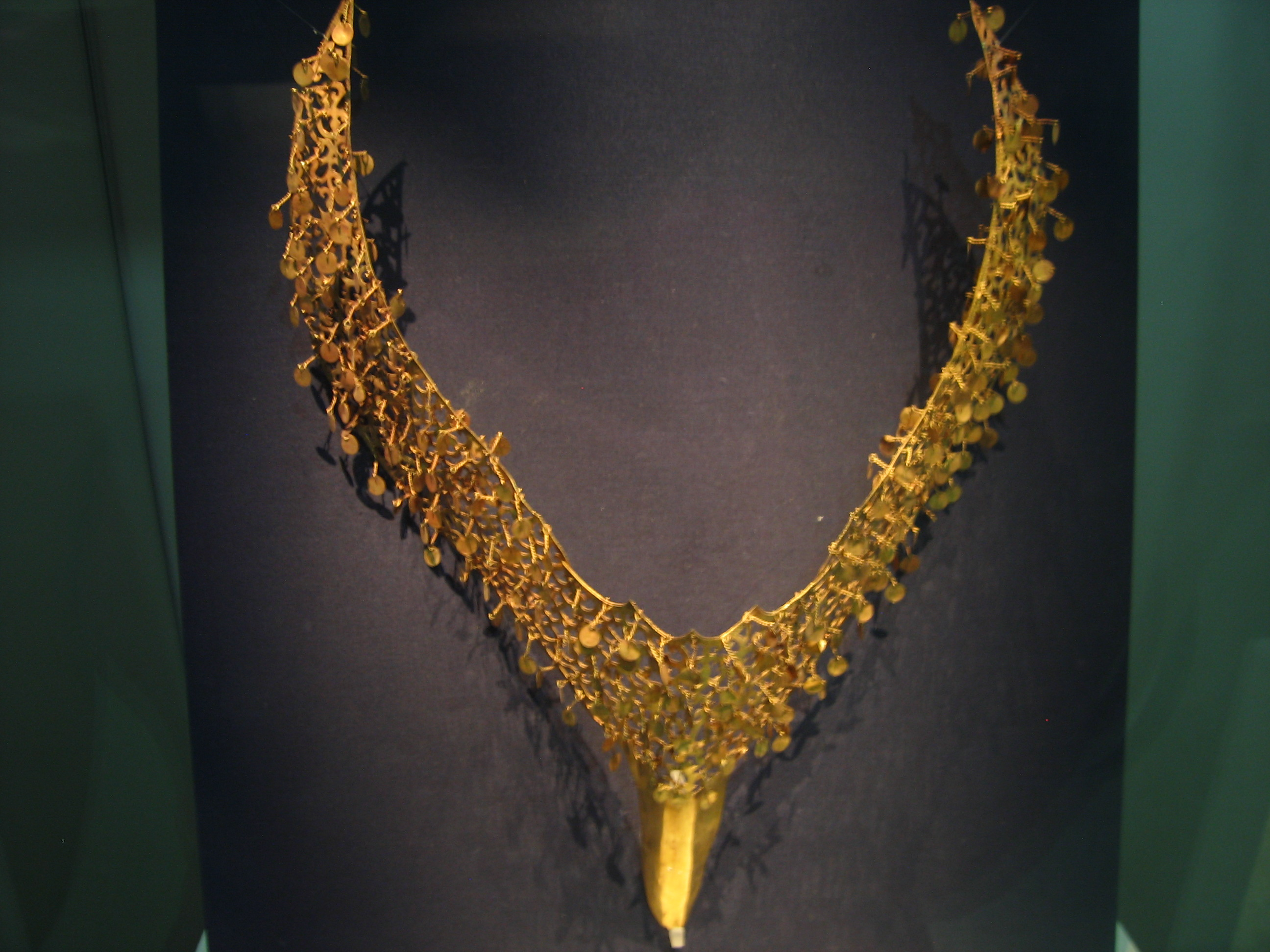

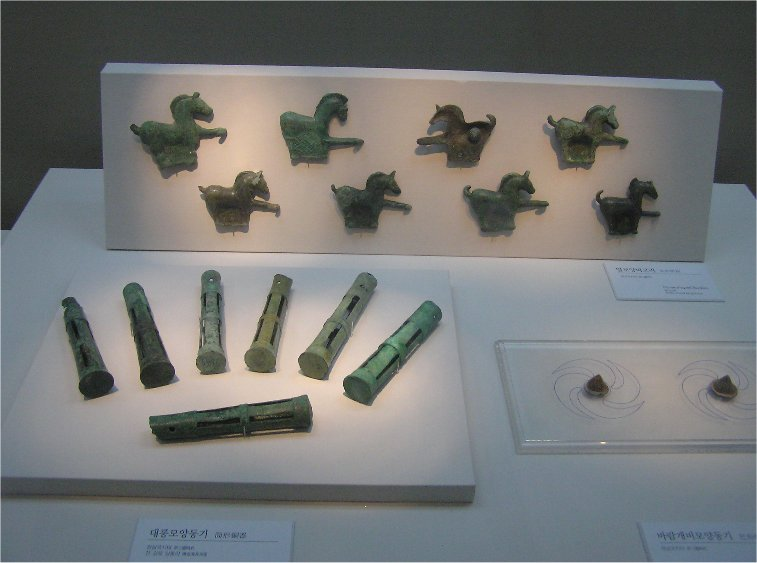

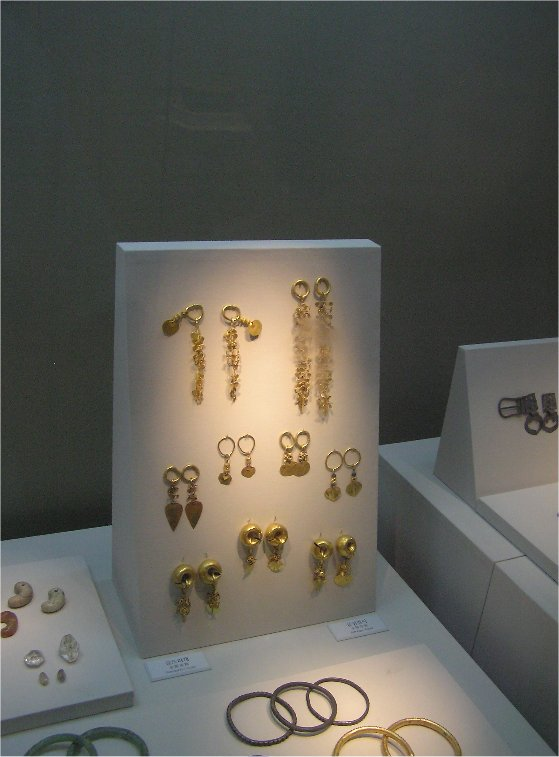

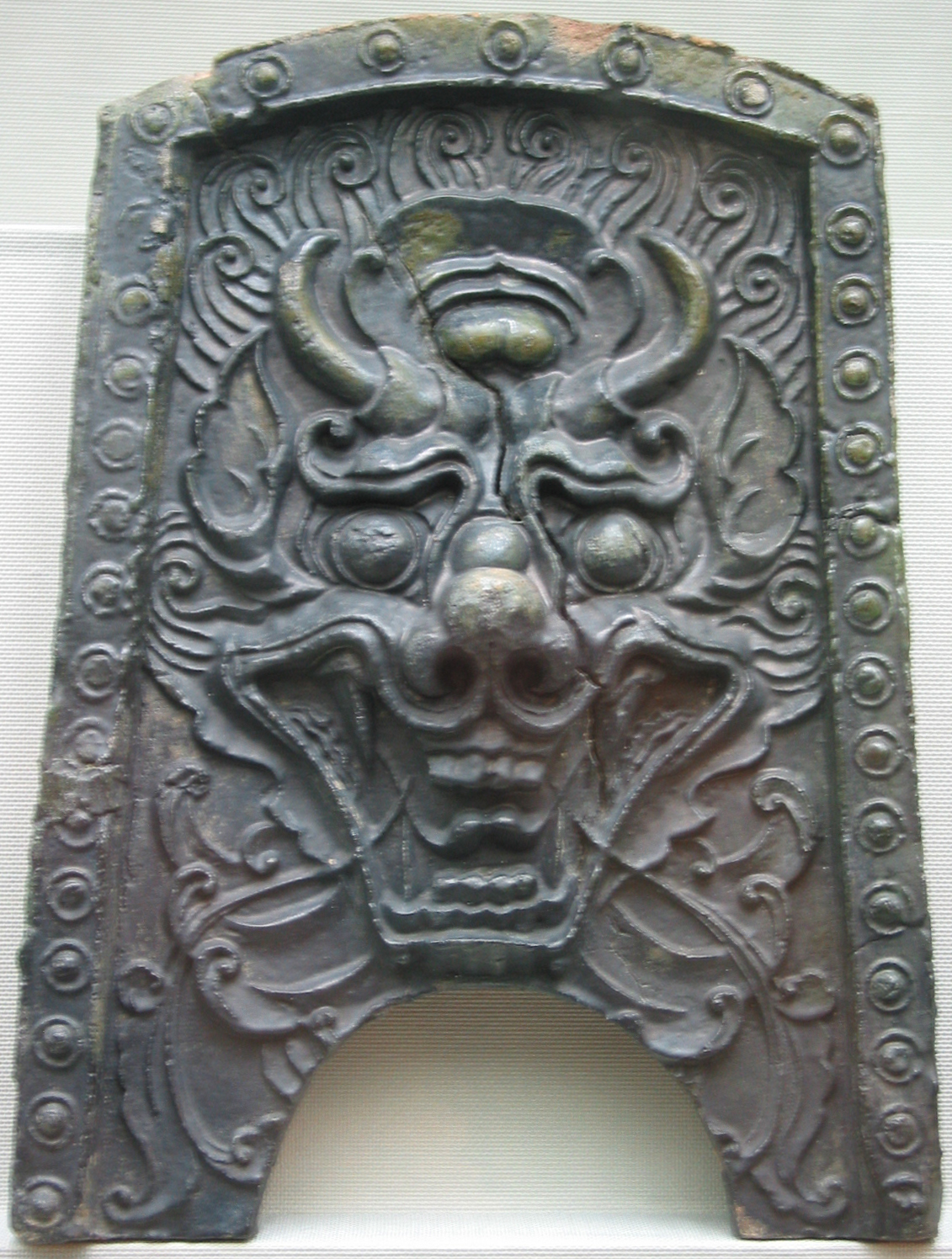

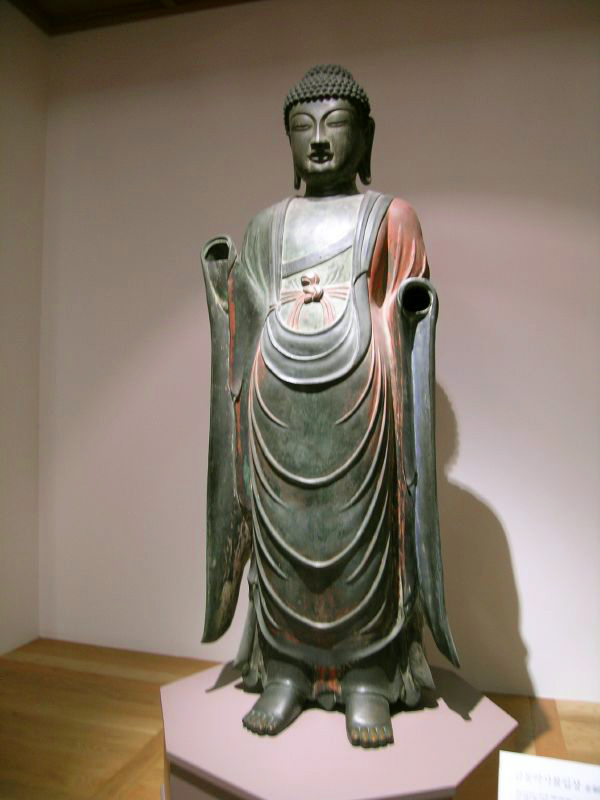

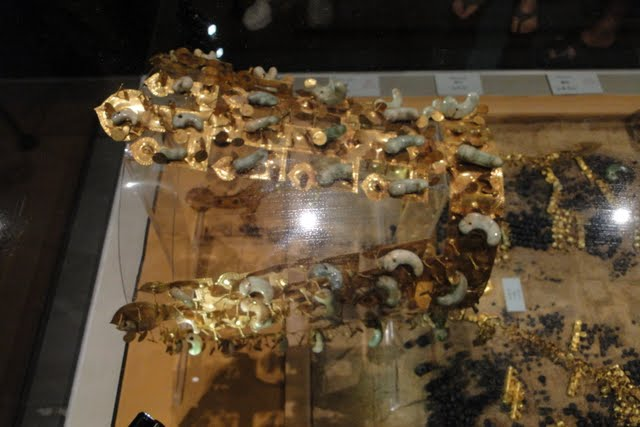

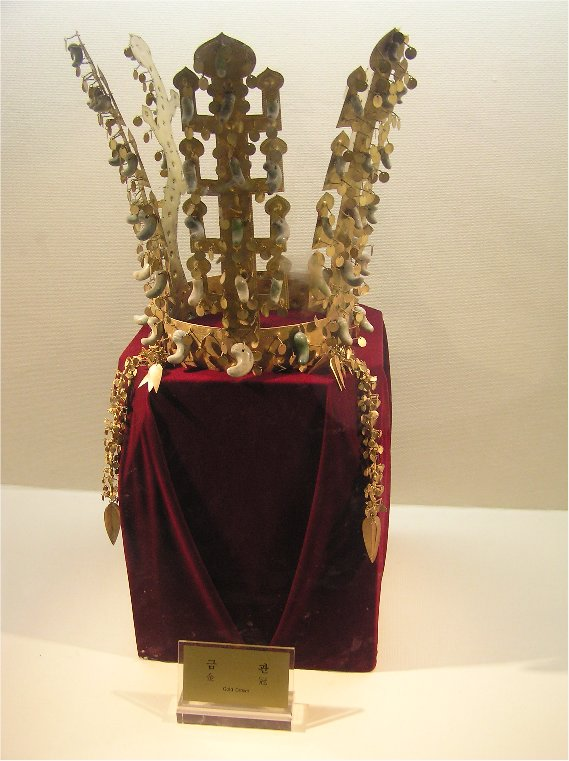

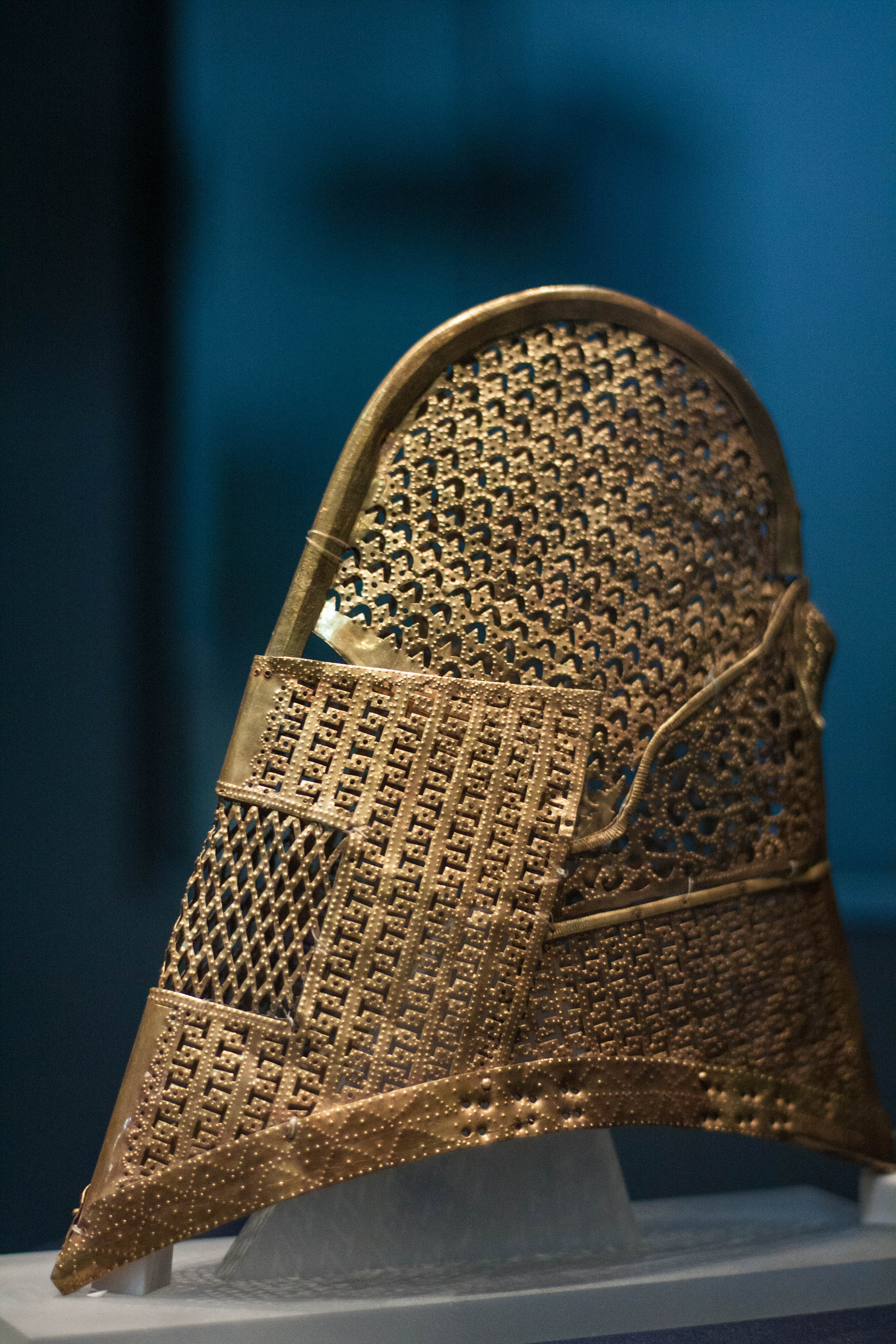

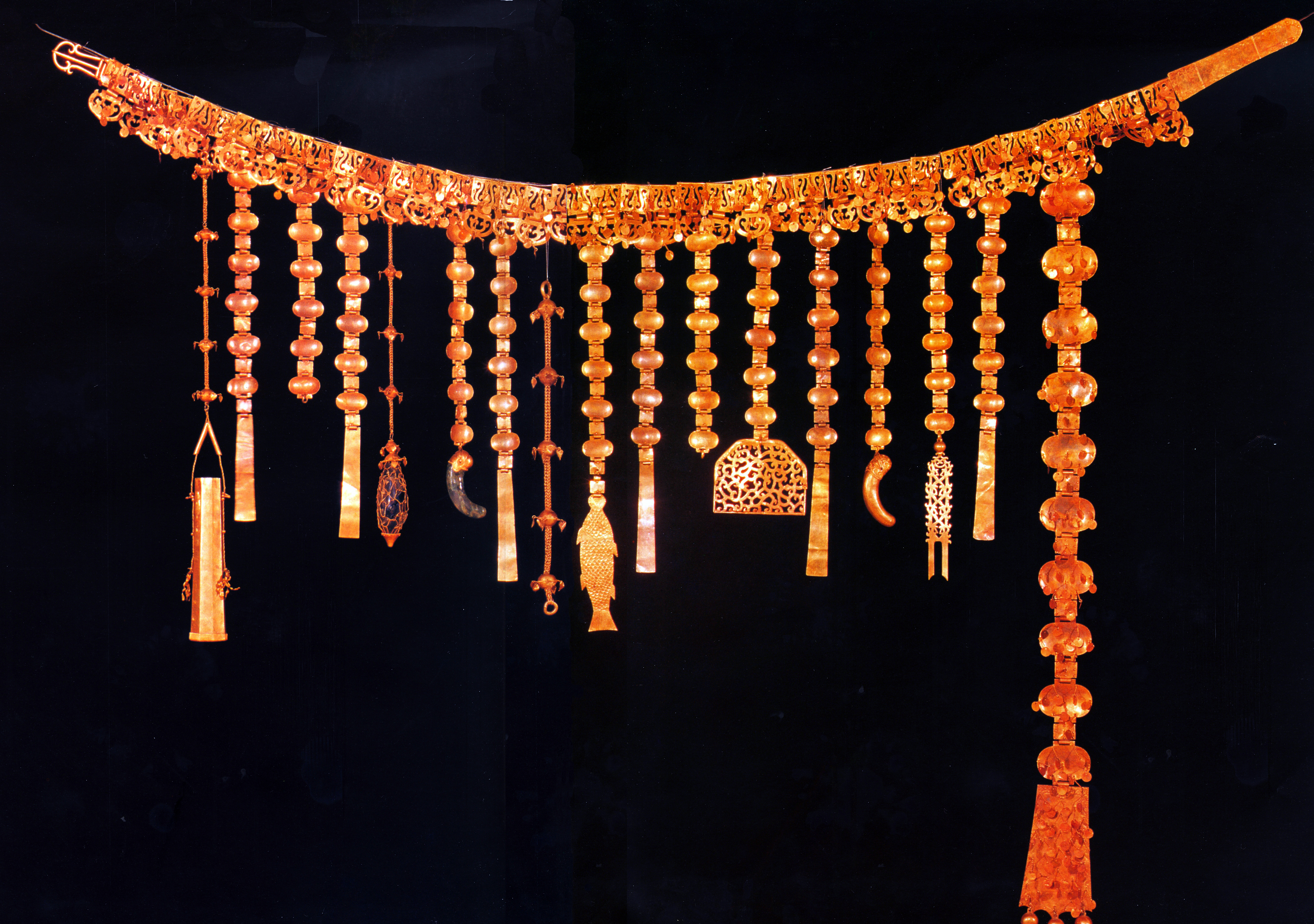

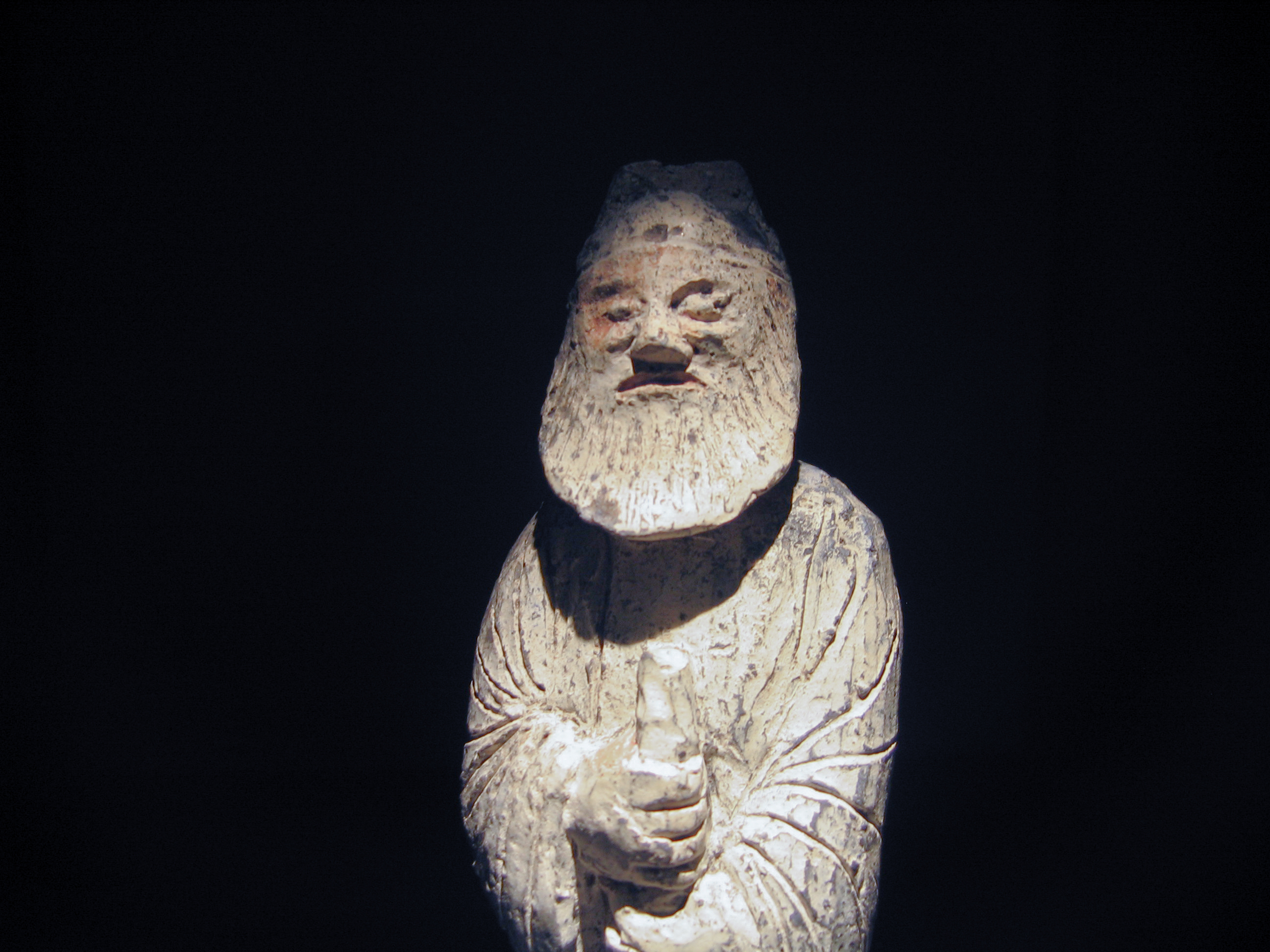
Wise Man Figurine

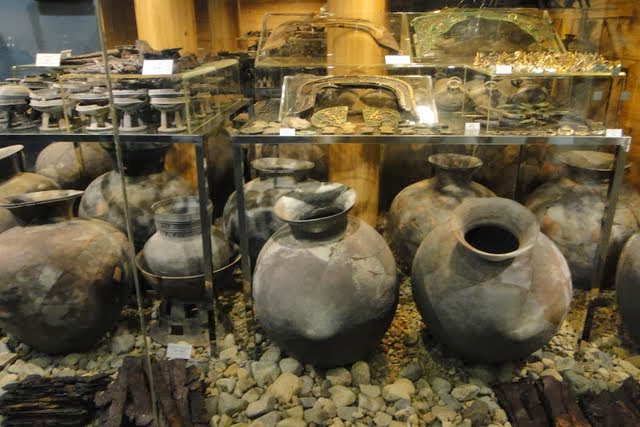
Ancient Korean jugs

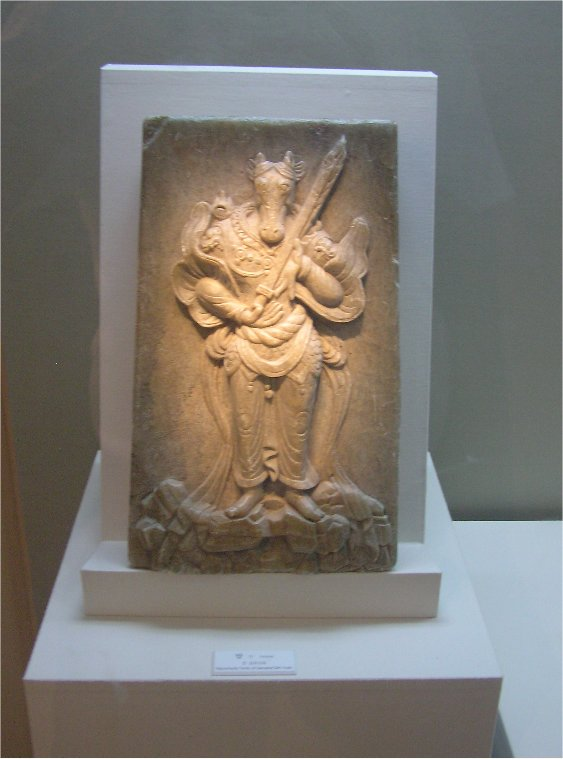

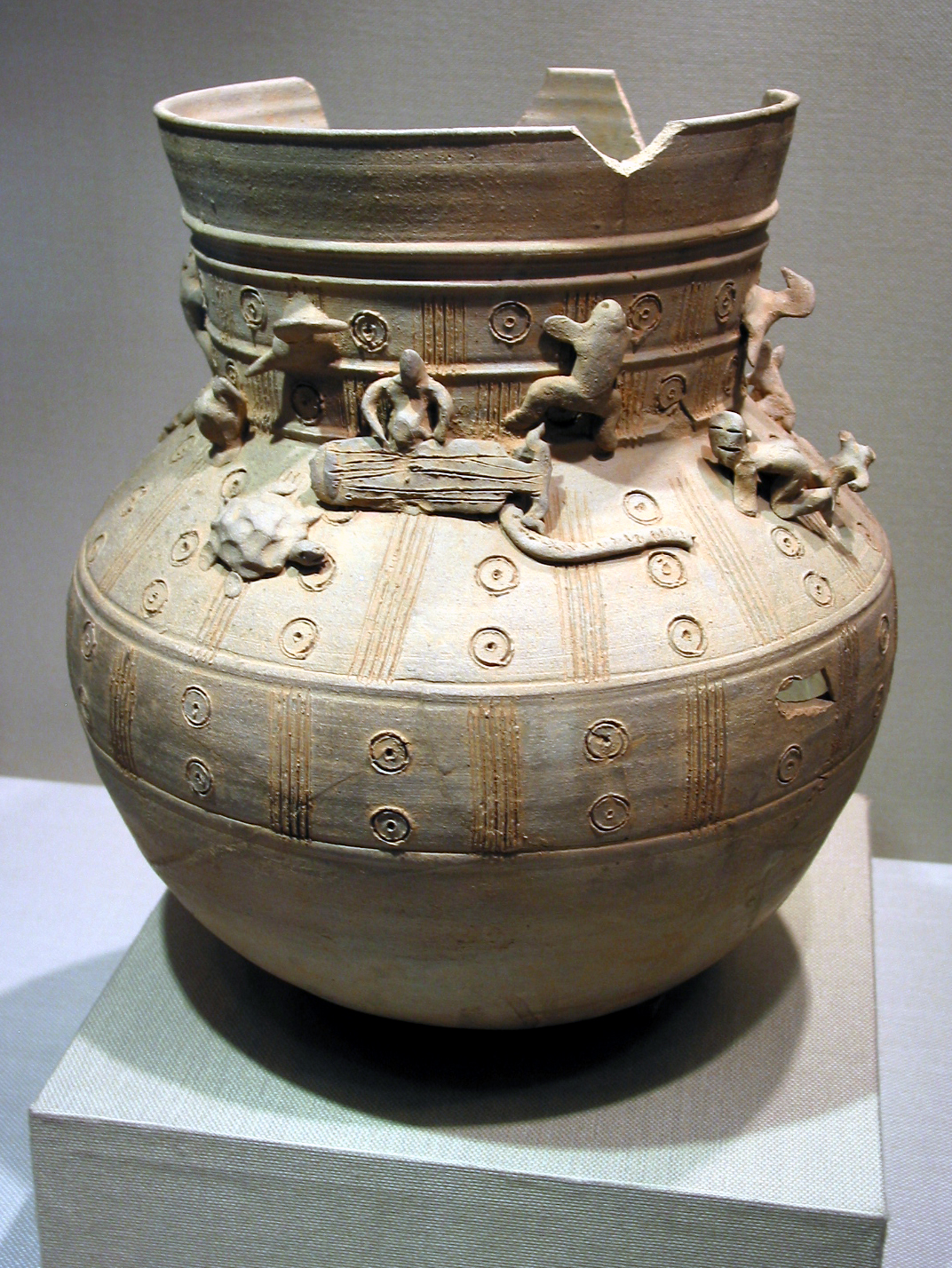

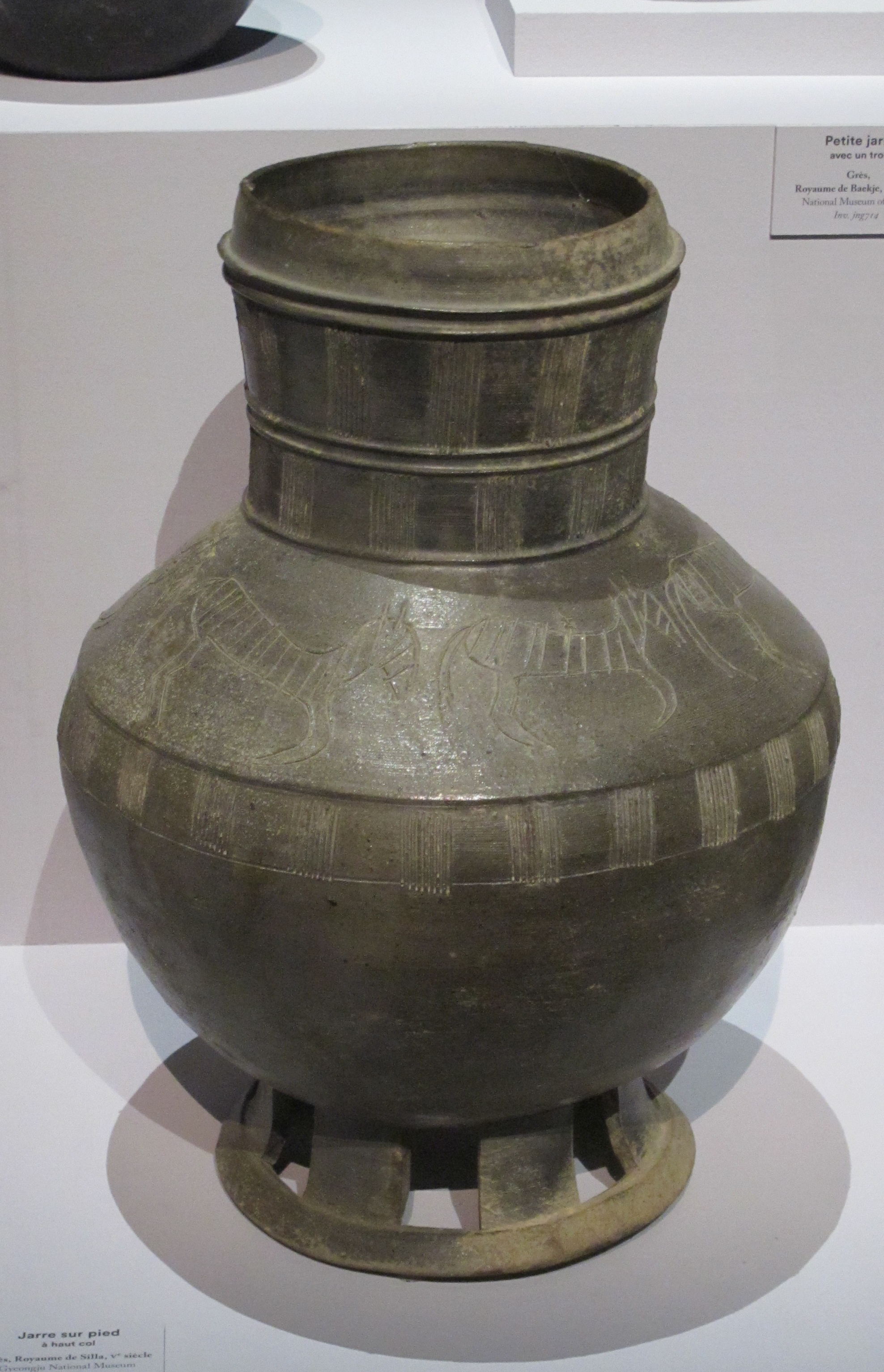

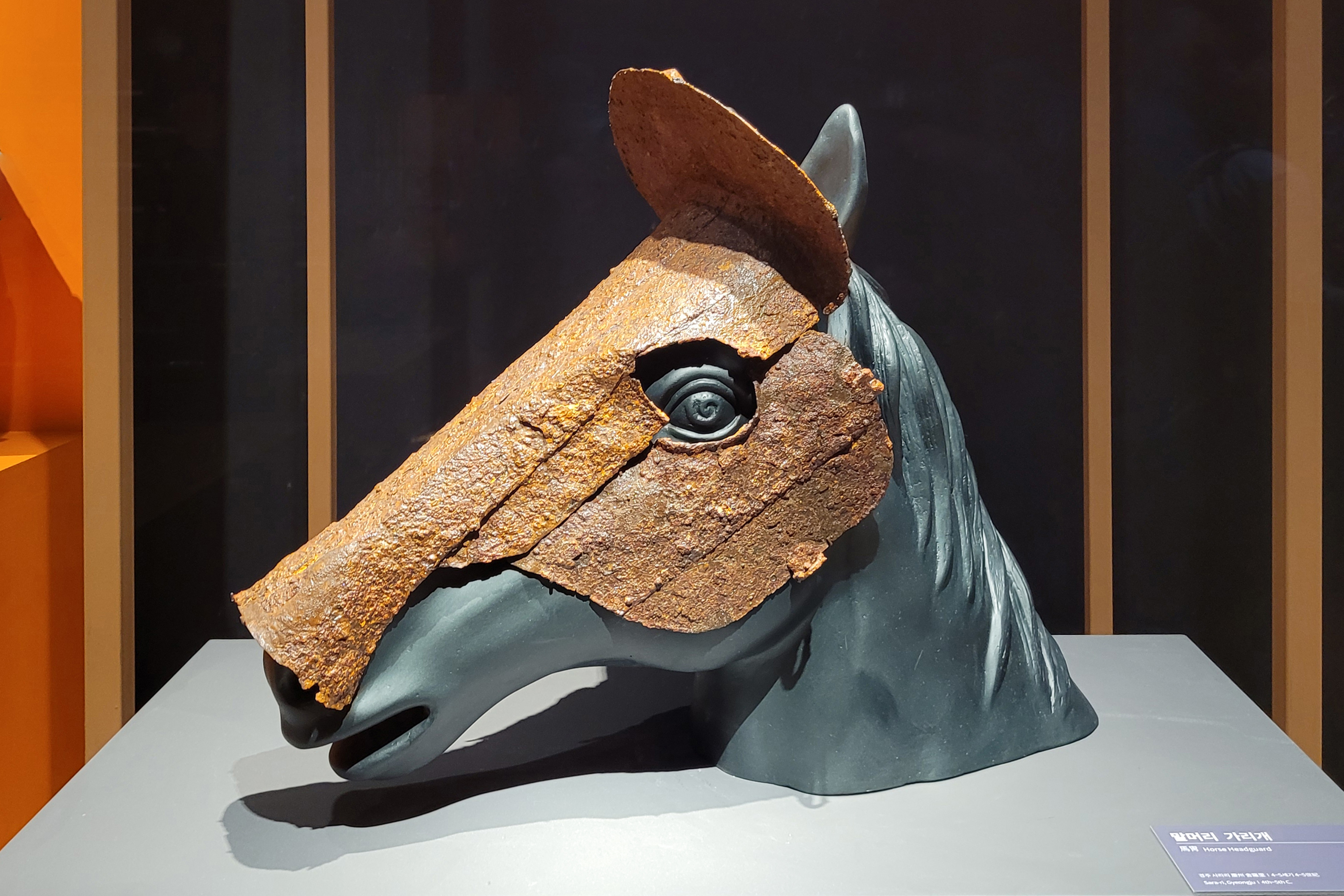
Horse headguard

== See also ==
- Tourism in Gyeongju
- List of museums
