= Gilt-bronze Buddha with Inscription: "Seventh Year of Yeonga" =

Ancient Buddhist sculpture found in Korea

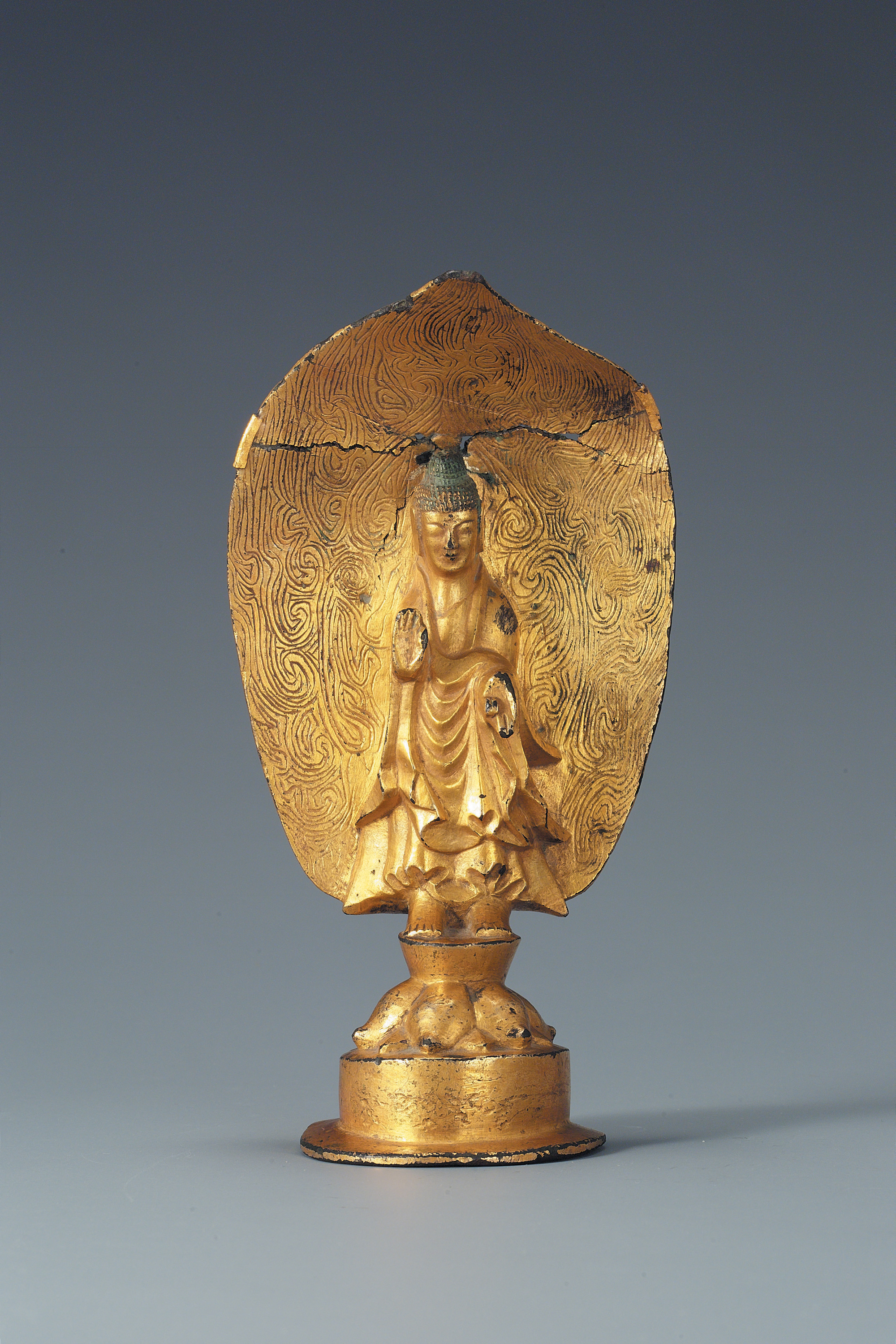
Gilt-bronze Standing Buddha with Inscription of "the Seventh Yeonga Year", National Treasure of Republic of Korea No. 119.

Gilt-bronze Buddha with Inscription: "Seventh Year of Yeonga" is the oldest Buddhist sculpture with an inscribed date that has ever been found in Korea. The inscription on the back of the halo states that it was produced in 539 in the Goguryeo Kingdom. Adapting the overall style of Buddhist sculpture from China's Northern Wei Dynasty with domestic elements, this statue is viewed as one of the first attempts to establish and assert Korean aesthetics. It is currently exhibited in the Buddhist Sculpture Gallery of the National Museum of Korea.

== Inscription ==
The back of the halo (nimbus) features an inscription carved in four lines with a total of 47 Chinese characters. The text explicitly states that the statue was manufactured in the "7th Year of Yeonga" (539 CE), an era name used by Goguryeo, making it a critical benchmark for dating Korean Buddhist sculptures and East Asian art history.

== Physical Features and Style ==
The entire artifact measures 16.2 cm in height (the Buddha figure itself is 9.1 cm, the halo is 12.1 cm, and the pedestal is 4.1 cm). Standing upright on a round lotus-patterned pedestal, the statue exhibits classic archaic features, including a low ushnisha, stylized snailshell hair (ushnisha and ushnisha-hair arrangement), a gentle archaic smile with small lips and nose, and flat, rectangular ears.

While the sculpture inherits artistic influences from Northern Wei dynasty in China, the dynamic, flame-like patterns on the halo and the dramatic folds of the robe reflect the distinct vigor and aesthetic independence of Goguryeo art.

== Discovery and History ==
The statue was accidentally discovered in 1963 in Tachon-ri, Daee-myeon, Uiryeong County, South Gyeongsang Province. On March 30, 1964, it was designated as National Treasure of South Korea.

On October 24, 1967, the statue was stolen while on display at the National Museum of Korea (then located at Deoksugung Palace). Fortunately, it was recovered safely just 12 hours after its disappearance.
