= Korean pagoda =

Wood or stone multi-tiered towers

Korean pagodas are a traditional Korean architectural form that began in the Three Kingdoms of Korea period. Koreans created a unique and distinct pagoda tradition using stone.

== History ==
Pagodas were created in India using earth, then in China using wood, which spread to the Three Kingdoms of Korea, and then Japan; however, the pagoda tradition of East Asia diverged, with China creating pagodas using bricks, Korea creating pagodas using stone, and Japan continuing to use wood.

Korean stone pagodas were first created in Baekje during the early 7th century and then inherited by Later Silla; 90% of the pagodas in Later Silla were made of stone. The stone pagoda tradition was propagated by the great abundance of high quality granite in Korea, which also led to other granite creations such as the Seokguram and Cheomseongdae. Goryeo, a devoutly Buddhist state, also inherited the stone pagoda tradition.

Examples of Korean wood pagodas are the Hwangnyongsa Pagoda and Palsangjeon of Silla.

== Transition from wood to stone pagodas ==
One of the earliest stone pagodas built is the Mireuksa stone pagoda from Paekche kingdom in 639 A.D. When the idea of pagodas was first introduced from neighboring Buddhist countries China and India, the influence of pagodas was largely based on plans from wooden pagodas, which eventually led to a widespread use of wood for the construction of pagodas in the early centuries of the three kingdoms period. However, around the 7th century, Paekche architects began shifting to stone pagodas and stone pagodas eventually became much more prominent around the 8th century. This is largely due to the reason that wooden pagodas were much more vulnerable to destruction from fire and quality stone materials were more accessible and readily available in Paekche during the early implementation of stone pagodas. Furthermore, architects began noticing how stone pagodas were much easier to maintain than wooden pagodas and stone pagodas are more sturdy than wooden pagodas.

Initially, stone pagodas still kept many of the features of wooden pagodas. When looking at the Mireuksa stone pagoda, it utilized similar characteristics and techniques that were seen in the wooden pagodas from the early Paekche eras. The Mireuksa stone pagoda will be compared with the nine-story wooden pagoda at Hwangnyongsa Temple. As this wooden pagoda was destroyed in a fire during the Mongol invasion, only records are able to be used to provide analysis on the structure. However, both the stone and wooden pagoda utilized pillars and with narrow passageways at each four sides of the base enabling people during the time to enter and exit the pagoda for most likely spiritual and religious reasons. There is also great emphasis on the proportionality of the structures as they are squares with equal sides and although the base portion is the largest portion of the two structures, the following stories are all equal in size. Moreover, another feature that is adopted by the stone pagoda is the roof. The wooden pagoda is able to utilize carving techniques of the wood to develop symmetric and smooth surfaces to the roofs separating each story. This creates an angle on the roof which is consistent with Buddhist architecture as the roofs are slanted to emphasize the different stories. However, as this technique is harder to implement with stone material, the stone pagoda carves in the layers of the roofs by increasing the size at the middle of the roof to be greatest and creates step-like patterns which decrease as you move away from the middle of the roof. This creates similar layers as seen in the roof of the wooden pagoda but utilizes an entirely different technique. The use of varying roof techniques is important in emphasizing the scale of the two pagodas as these pagodas were much larger than other pagodas of the time. This emphasis on the scale of these two pagodas as much larger pagodas contributes to the idea that individuals with authority during the time utilize pagodas as indicators of their power, as larger pagodas indicate a stronger belief in the Buddhist religion and a more united kingdom.

== Challenging traditional norms of pagodas and society ==
Built under the rule of Silla's first reigning queen, Bunhwangsa pagoda is one of Silla's oldest stone pagodas that signify the importance of Buddhism as it is a representation of the significant influence Buddhism had on the political and socioeconomic status of Silla at the time. This pagoda used unprecedented material in its construction, which makes it distinct from other pagodas. This is due to the reason that although it is a stone pagoda, it was made out of brick shaped stones in order to resemble bricks (National Museum Korea). Apart from its political and religious significance of Buddhism, this pagoda also became an important symbol of gender inequalities during the time. While her power as queen of Silla was questioned by many, including the other kingdoms and its ally China, queen Seondeok decided to build a seven-story pagoda to strengthen her authority and the legitimacy of her rule as a queen. Like previous pagodas, it was designed with symmetry and with its roofs at each level built similarly. As this pagoda was larger in scale compared to previous pagodas built, it quickly united the people of Silla under the influence of Buddhism and strengthened her legitimacy as queen of Silla as it warned the other kingdoms of Silla as a kingdom that was still powerful. This is due to the reason that building such large pagodas at the time required a lot of labor, material, and coordination between the architects and builders of the pagoda. Apart from this, the pagoda also became an important symbol of Buddhism for the people of Silla as it became a sacred religious and spiritual site for the people of Silla to worship the Buddha and pray for the unification of Silla with the other kingdoms. With the construction of this pagoda, the people of Silla became more united, as their belief in Buddhism through this pagoda as a sacred worshiping site enabled them to come together and pray for the reunification of Silla with the other kingdoms, as well as defending themselves against foreign invasion.

Early in the Silla and Paekche kingdoms, the pagoda initially served as a site for the preservation of the body parts of the cremation and reaching of Nirvana of the Buddha Sakyamuni. However, over time, the purpose of pagodas eventually shifted to more accessible and became sacred sites for worshiping Buddhism in general rather than just the Buddha. Apart from the purpose of the pagodas, the characteristics of the pagodas also shifted to include more features that were previously not seen in the early stone pagodas. This included the development of flat pavements at the base of the pagoda in order to add support to the base of the structure. Moreover, a long cylindrical structure at the top of the pagoda became more popular and enabled the people worshiping at these sites to feel closer to the Buddha, as they acted as an antenna which connected the Buddha to the people. Stone railings were also added with various sculpted designs depicting various themes and symbols from buddhism. These changes led to the pagodas that we see today.

A prominent example of these changes in the Dabotap pagoda, which challenged the traditional norms of the structure of stone pagodas. One of the main reasons is due to controversy surrounding the number of floors on this pagoda, as it ranges from 2-4 depending on the viewer. The main reason behind this controversy is due to the reason that this pagoda utilizes various shapes in different scales which creates unique perspectives that can be interpreted differently depending on the person. This is due to the square and octagonal-shaped roofs separating the various stories have various sizes that decrease as the height of the pagoda increases, with the exception of the top roof. Moreover, apart from the scale, the technique and surface of each of the roof shapes vary. As an example, the roofs towards the base of the pagoda are more square and have sharper edges. However, the roofs at the top of the pagoda have edges that are more round and spherical, which implements a unique symmetrical technique to develop greater depth and texture on the edges around the roof. Moreover, this pagoda also implements railings around a square and circular-shaped roof, which is a unique feature that also challenges the traditional norms of previous pagodas. Additionally, another unique aspect of this pagoda is the lion figure decoration that was located at the top of each stairway and entranceway/side of the pagoda. Although there is only one lion figure remaining—due to looting, these figures played an important role and were an important symbol of Buddhism as they represented strength and protection, as they were the protector of the Buddha. The four flights of stairs may have played a significant role in the worshiping of the Buddha and Buddhism at the time, as it may have enabled religious figures or people at the time to enter and place important objects at the center of the pagoda for worship.

== Gallery ==
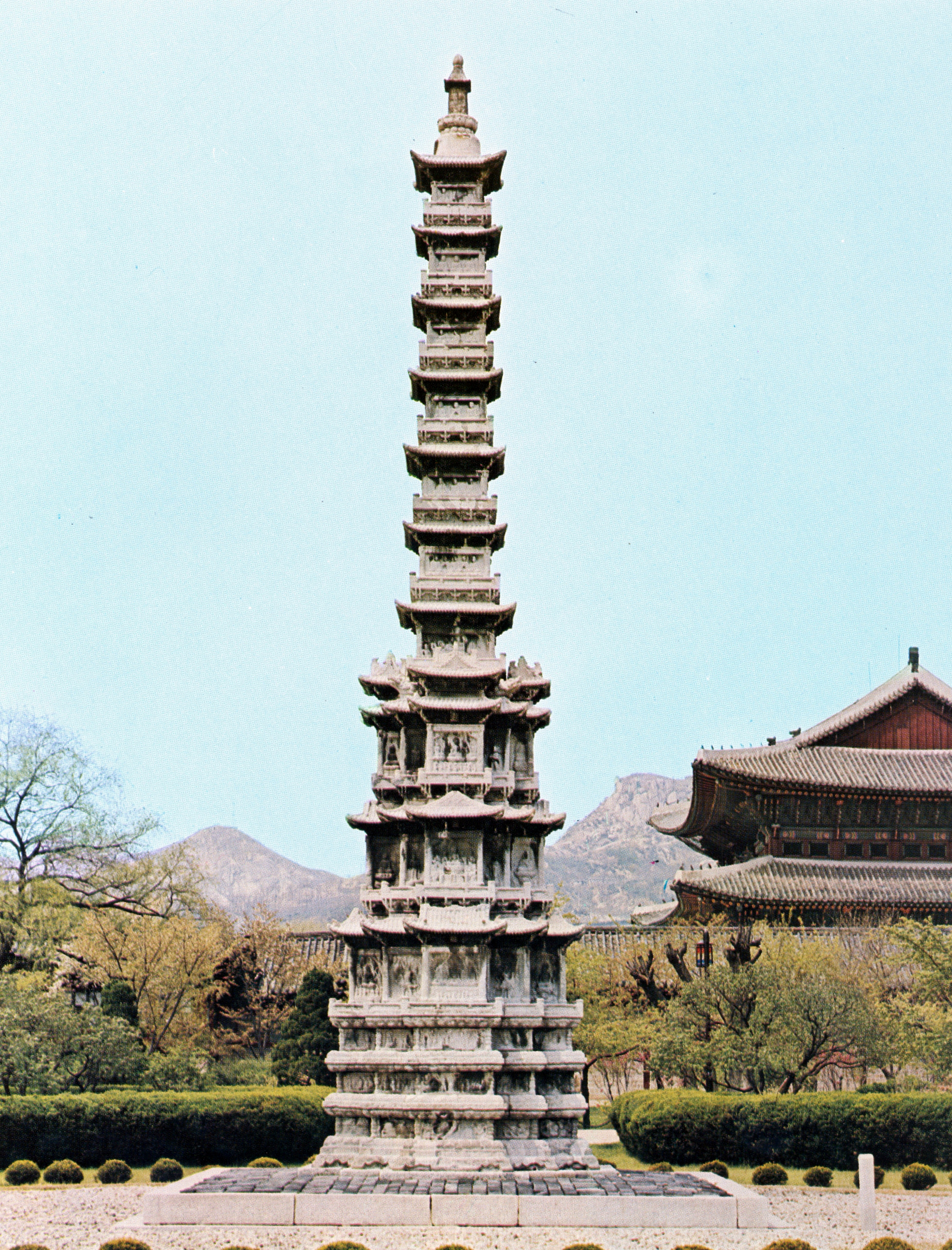
Gyeongcheonsa Pagoda

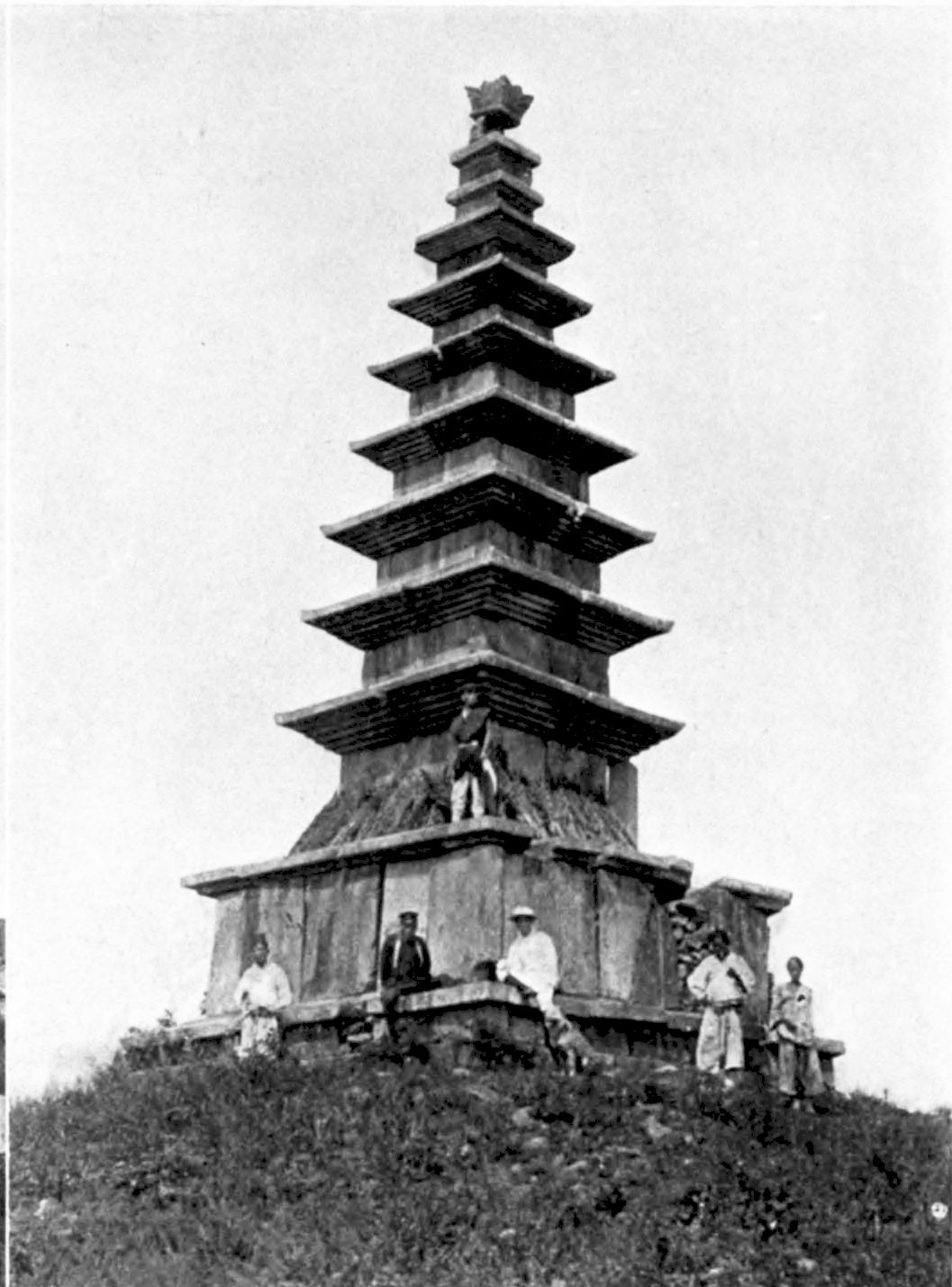
Jungang Pagoda

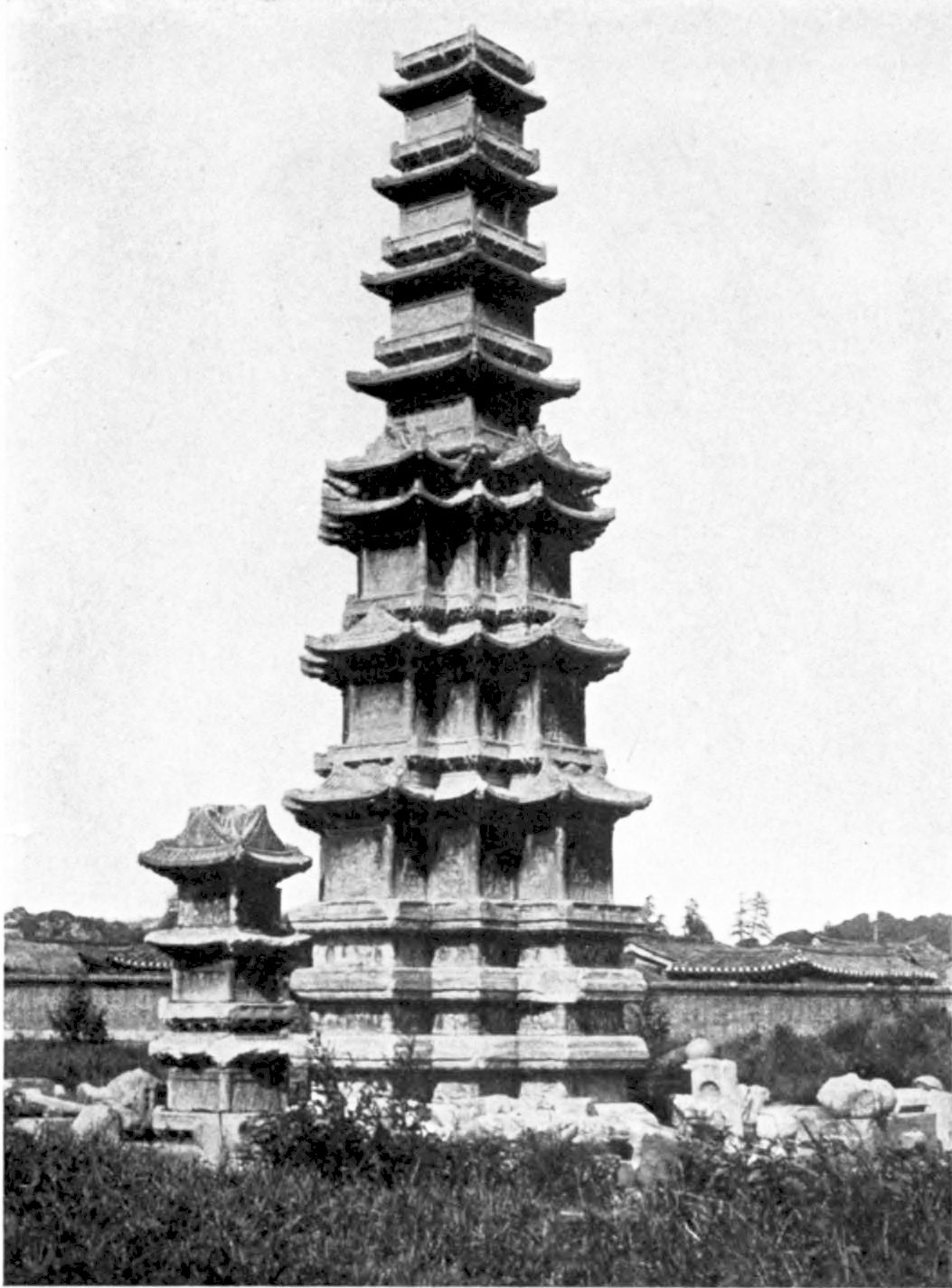
Wongaksa Pagoda
top portion missing

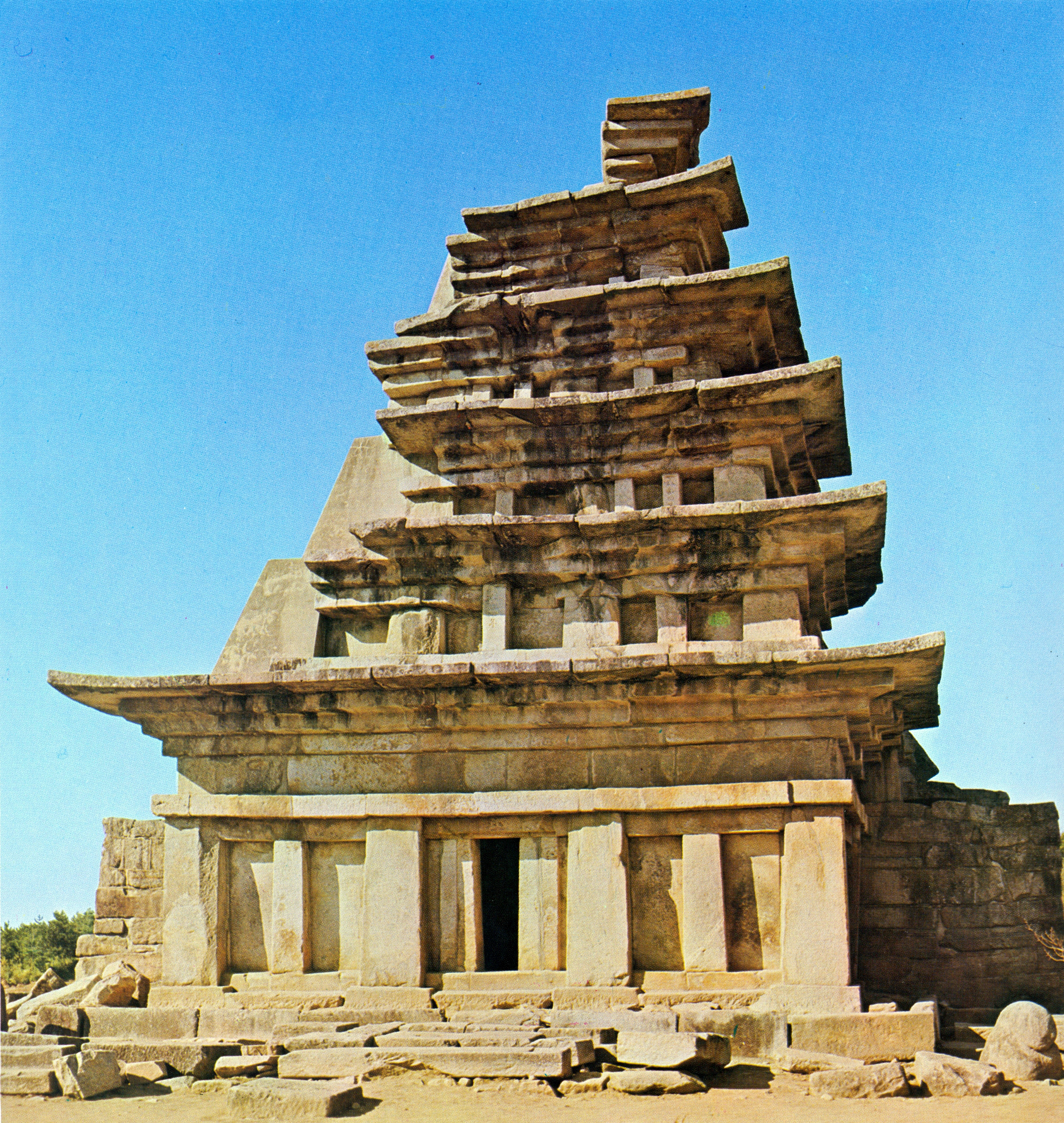
Mireuksa Pagoda

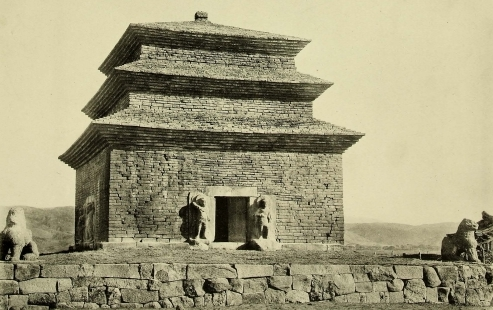
Bunhwangsa Pagoda
originally 9 stories tall

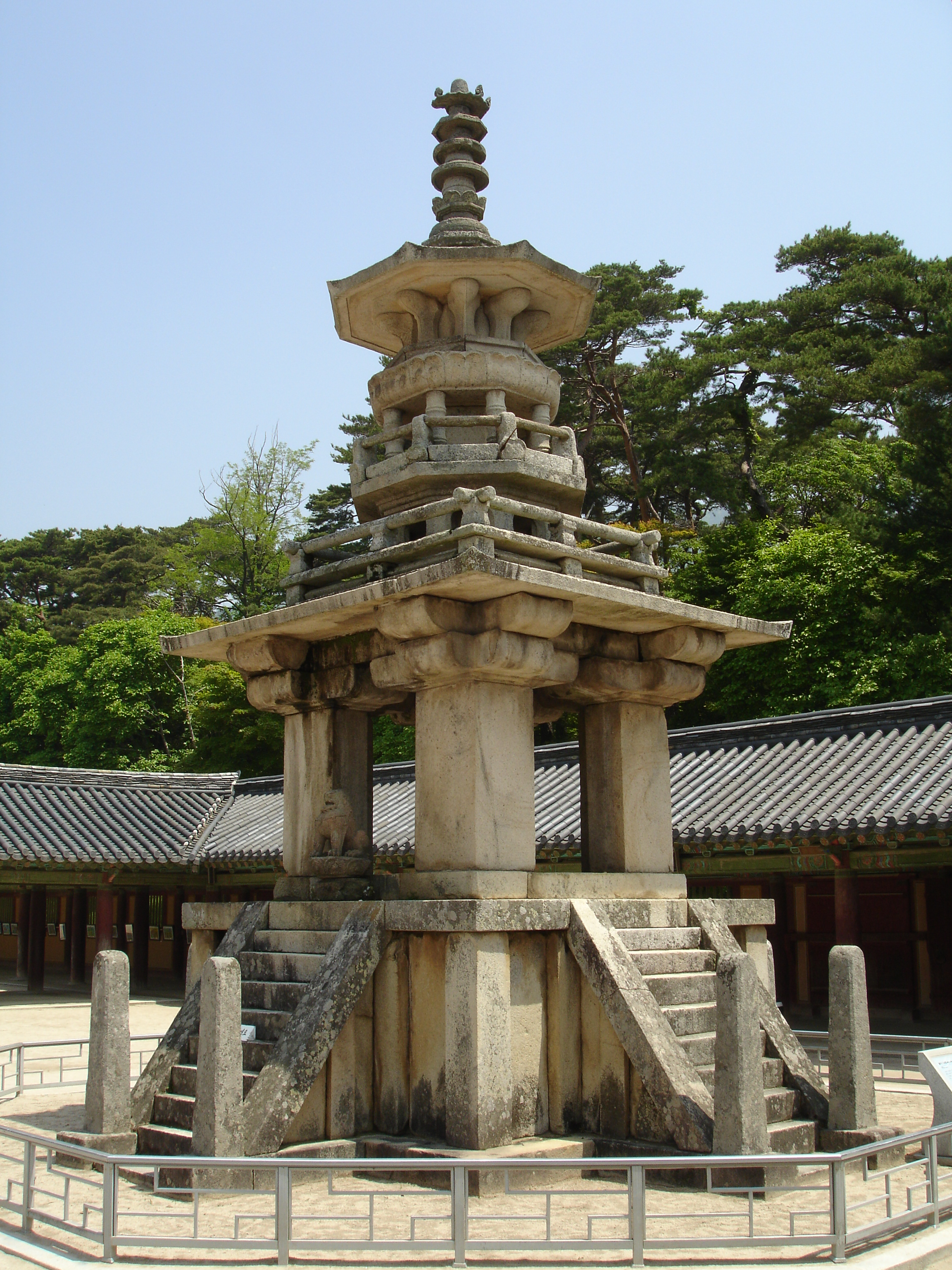
Dabo Pagoda
