= Temple Site in Cheongun-dong, Gyeongju =

Silla-era ruins in Gyeongju, South Korea

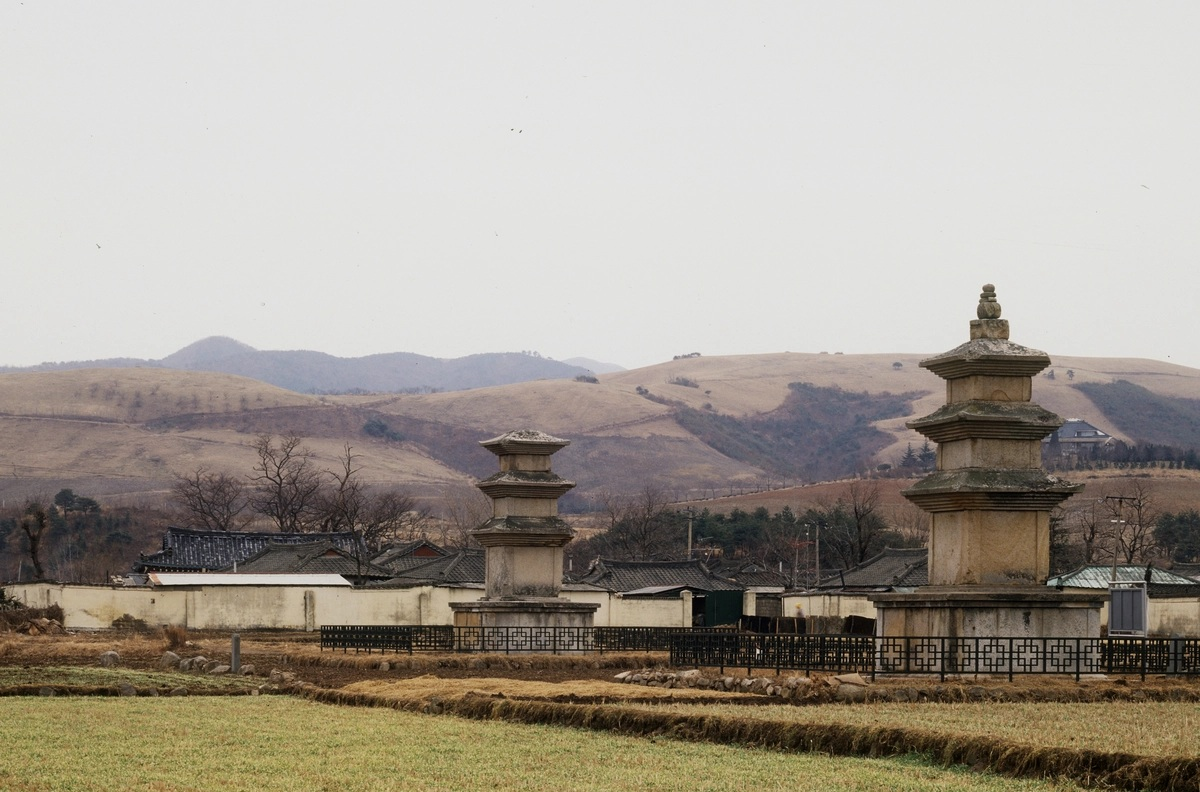
- The temple site

Religion
- Affiliation: Korean Buddhism

Location
- Location: Gyeongju, South Korea
- Interactive map of Temple Site in Cheongun-dong, Gyeongju
- Coordinates: 35°49′56″N 129°16′54″E
- Historic Sites of South Korea
- Designated: 1963-01-21

The Temple Site in Cheongun-dong, Gyeongju (Korean: 경주 천군동 사지; Hanja: 慶州千軍洞寺址) is the remains of a Silla-era temple in Cheongun-dong, Gyeongju, South Korea. On January 21, 1963, it was made a Historic Site of South Korea.

The name of the temple is unknown. It is believed to be from the Unified Silla period (668–935) because of the style of surviving pagodas at the site. The site was first excavated in 1938, during the Japanese colonial period. Various building sites were identified. Various artifacts were recovered, which are now in the Gyeongju National Museum.
