= Wongaksa Pagoda =

Stone pagoda in Seoul, South Korea

Coordinates: 37°34′18″N 126°59′18″E

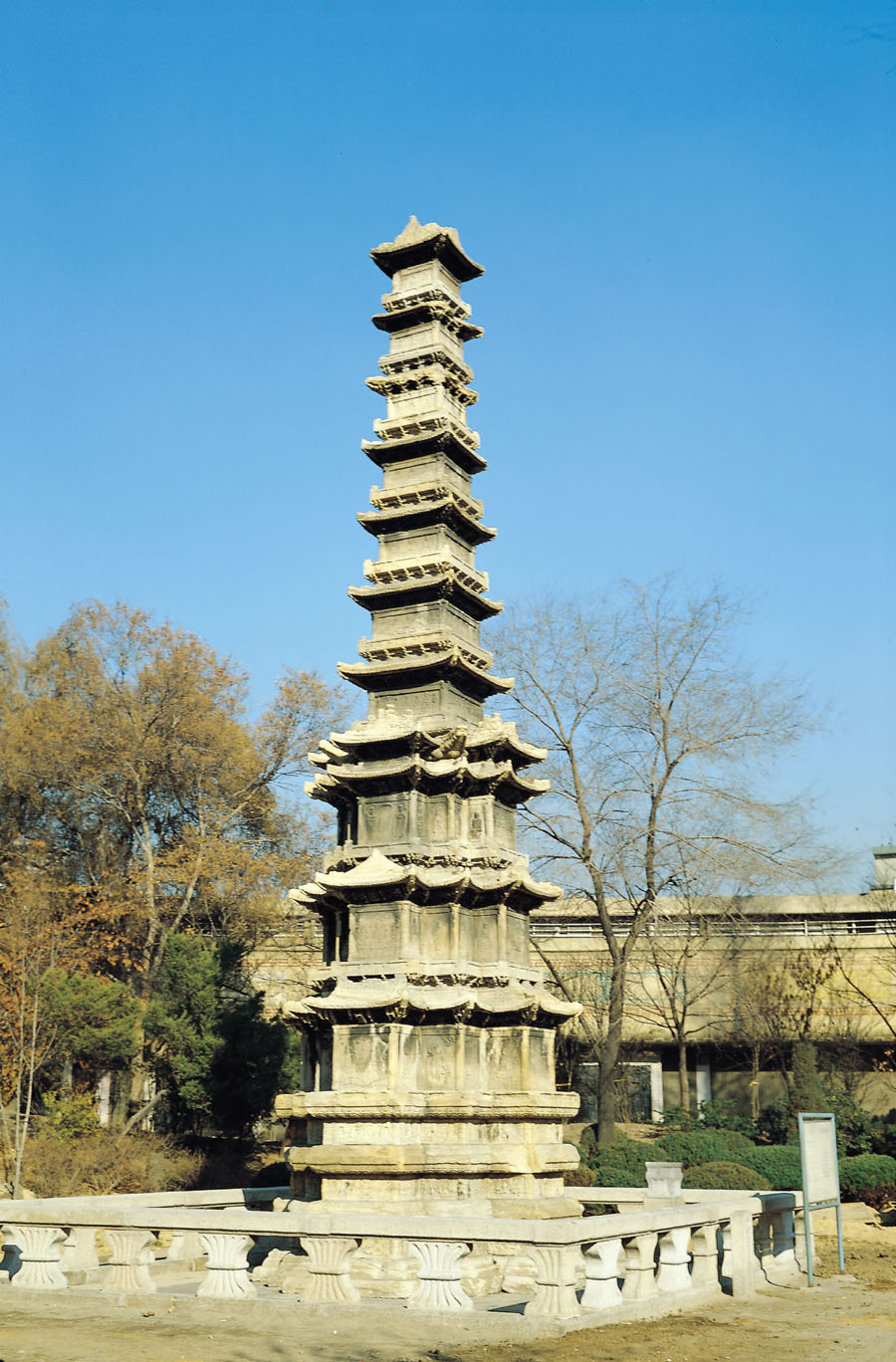
- The pagoda
- Year: 1467
- Designation

National Treasure (South Korea)
- Designated: 1962-12-20
- Reference no.: 2
- Location: Seoul

Korean name
- Hangul: 원각사지십층석탑
- Hanja: 圓覺寺地十層石塔
- Revised Romanization: Wongaksaji Sipcheung Seoktap
- McCune–Reischauer: Wŏn'gaksaji Sipch'ŭng Sŏkt'ap

Wongaksa Pagoda (Korean: 원각사지십층석탑) is a 12-meter tall, ten story marble pagoda located in Tapgol Park, Seoul, South Korea.

It was made a National Treasure of South Korea in 1962.

== Description ==
It was constructed in 1467, during the early Joseon period, at the temple Wongaksa. King Sejo had founded the temple two years prior to the pagoda's construction, on the site of an older Goryeo-period temple, Heungboksa. The temple was closed and turned into a kisaeng house by the (later deposed) king known as Yeonsan-gun (1476–1506, r. 1494–1506), and under his successor, King Jungjong (1488–1544, r. 1506–1544) the site was turned into government offices. The pagoda and a memorial stele commemorating the foundation of Wongaksa alone survived. The site of the temple was later occupied by houses. During the Imjin War of the 1590s, the top portion of the pagoda was pulled down and lay on the ground at the foot of the pagoda until it was replaced by American military engineers in 1947.

Foreign visitors to Seoul in the late 19th century often went to admire the beautiful pagoda but it was almost inaccessible, hidden in the courtyard of a small house, and in 1897 John McLeavy Brown, the Irish financial advisor to King Gojong, was authorized by the king to turn the area into Seoul's first public park. He called it Pagoda Park, the name it had at the time of the 1919 March First Movement. Today the park is known as Tapgol Park and the pagoda stands in a protective glass case.

The pagoda is considered by art historians to be one of the finest Korean pagodas. The pagoda was designated as the second national treasure of Korea on December 12, 1962. From an inscription on the upper part of the pagoda it is known that the pagoda was built in 1467, the thirteenth year of King Sejo's reign.

It is one of the few pagodas made from marble in Korea. Typical Korean pagodas are made from granite, a material abundant on the peninsula. The pedestal supporting the pagoda is three-tiered, and its shape seen from the top looks like a Chinese character, 亞. The first three storeys of the pagoda follow the shape of the base and the next seven storeys are shaped in form of squares. Dragons, lions, lotus flowers, phoenixes, Buddhas, Bodhisattvas, and the Four Heavenly Kings carved on each storey of the pagoda. The pagoda, while made of stone, is carved to look as if it was made from wood. The pagoda has brackets, pillars, and curved roof shapes that imitate a wooden pagoda design.

The pagoda was modelled on the beautiful Gyeongcheonsa Pagoda, which was made during the Goryeo Era. Originally erected in 1348 at Gyeongcheon-sa temple on Mt. Busosan in Gwangdeok-myeon, Gaepung-gun, Gyeonggi-do (near Gaesong, now in North Korea), it was taken to Japan in 1907, returned to Korea in 1918, and is now housed at the National Museum of Korea.

The first detailed description of the pagoda in English, together with a translation of the inscription on the stele, was published in 1915 by the scholarly missionary James Scarth Gale in the Royal Asiatic Society Korea Branch's Transactions Vol. VI, part II:1-22 "The Pagoda of Seoul."

== Gallery ==
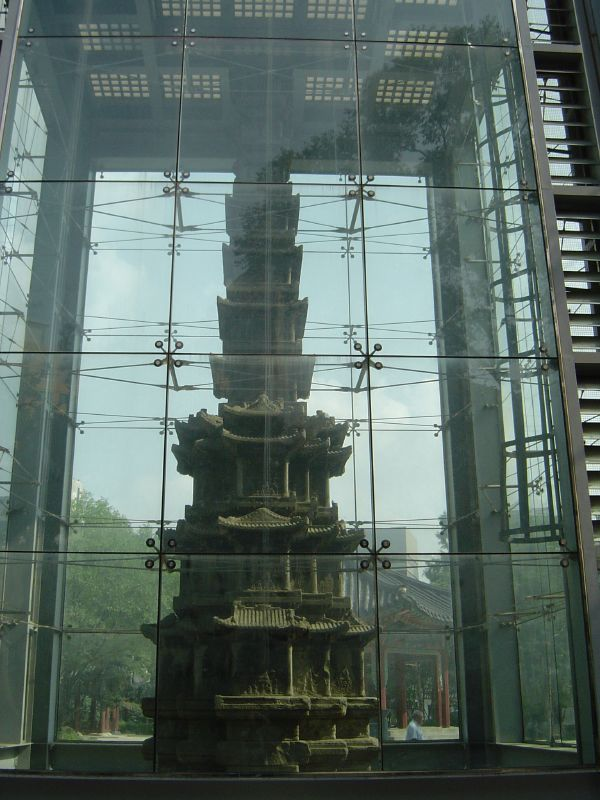

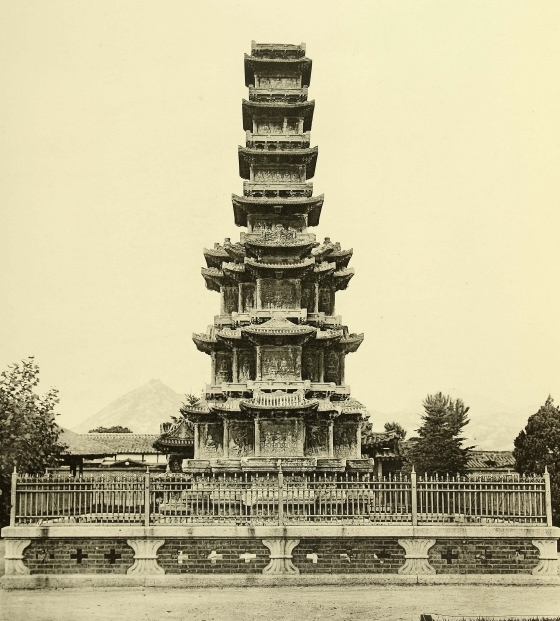
Note the missing top portion.

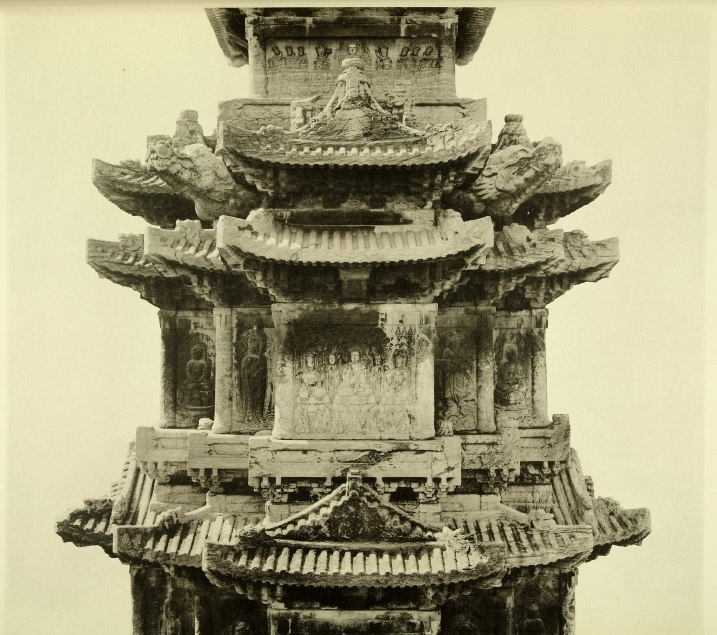

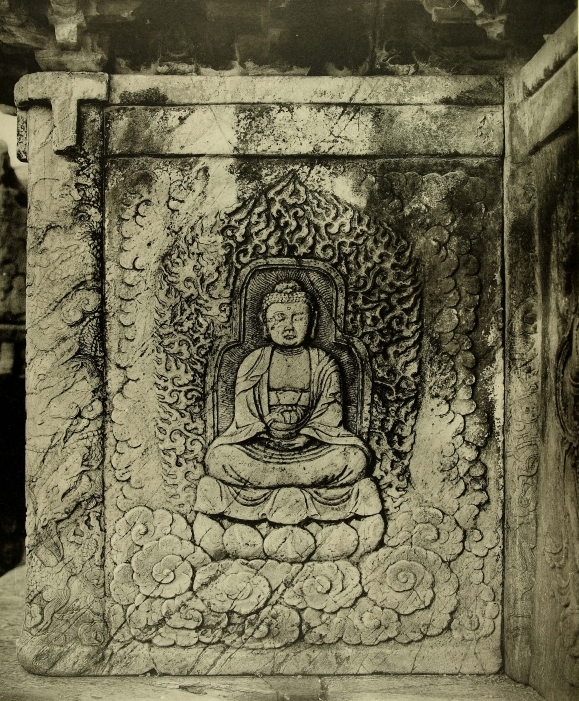

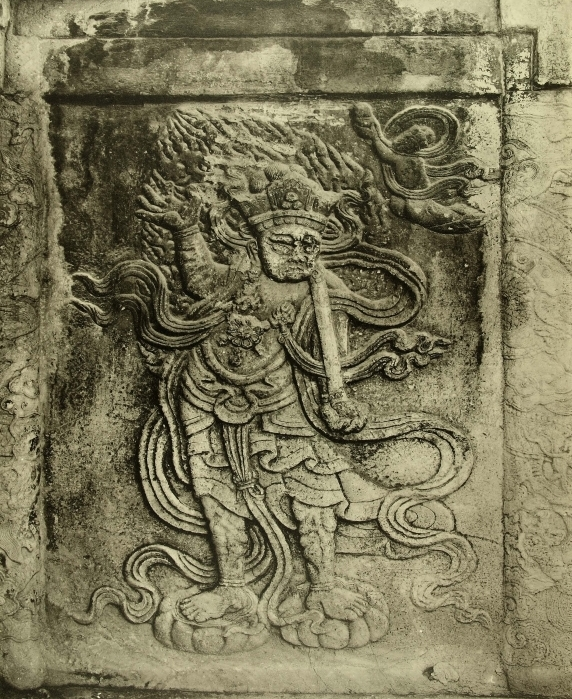

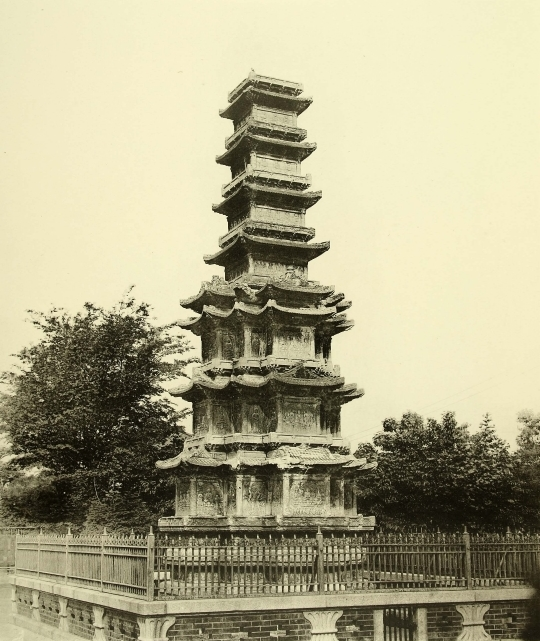
Note the missing top portion.

== See also ==
- National treasures of South Korea
- Korean Buddhism
- Culture of Korea
- Gyeongcheonsa Pagoda
