= Gyeongcheonsa Pagoda =

Korean stone pagoda and national treasure

Coordinates: 37.52392206°N 126.98145008°E

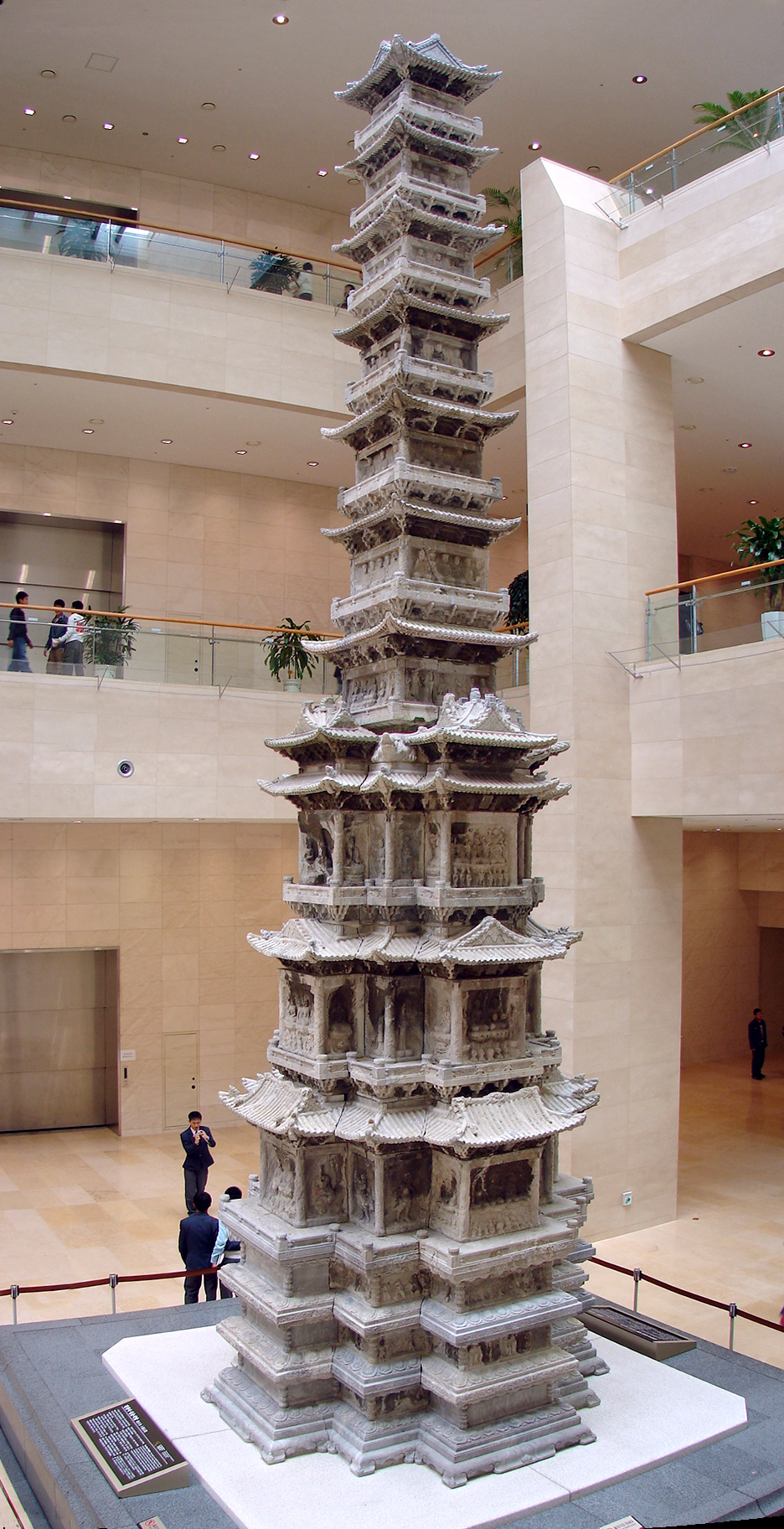
- Gyeongcheonsa Pagoda sits on the first floor of the National Museum of Korea.

Korean name
- Hangul: 경천사 십층석탑
- Hanja: 敬天寺十層石塔
- RR: Gyeongcheonsa sipcheung seoktap
- MR: Kyŏngch'ŏnsa sipch'ŭng sŏkt'ap

Gyeongcheonsa Pagoda (Korean: 경천사 십층석탑) is National Treasure of Korea No. 86. It was designated by the South Korean government on December 20, 1962.

== History ==
An inscription on the first story of the pagoda states that it was erected in the fourth year of King Chungmok in 1348. The pagoda was first placed at the now-lost Gyeongcheonsa Temple which sat at the foot of Mt. Buso in Gwangdeok-myeon, Gaepung-gun, Gyeonggi-do Province.

About 120 years after the pagoda was built, the Joseon royal court made another similar stone pagoda, which was erected at Wongaksa Temple.

== Removal to Japan ==
In 1907, during the Japanese occupation of Korea, the pagoda was smuggled into Japan by Mitsuaki Tanaka, Japan's minister of Imperial Household Affairs.

Two western journalists, Ernest T. Bethell from England and Homer Hulbert from America, launched an international press campaign denouncing the theft.

In 1918, the pagoda was returned and placed on the grounds of Gyeongbokgung Palace. Today, the pagoda stands in one of the main halls of the National Museum of Korea.

== Features ==
The pagoda stands 13.5 m in height and is ten storeys tall. However, because of the three-tiered foundation, it is a common mistake to believe that the pagoda has thirteen storeys. Unlike most Goryeo-era pagodas, this pagoda is made from marble. The preferred material of Korean sculptors was generally granite. The later Joseon-era Wongaksa Pagoda is stylistically very similar and is believed to have been heavily influenced by the Gyeongcheonsa Pagoda.

Gyeongcheonsa Pagoda sits on a three-tiered foundation which projects in four directions like a cross. The first three storeys of the pagoda share the same shape as the foundation. Each panel of this tiered foundation is carved with Buddhas, Bodhisattvas, flowers, and arabesque patterns.

The remaining storeys are square in shape and share intricate detailing which tries to create the illusion that the marble pagoda is made from wood. Each remaining storey has railings, a hip-and-gabled roof, eaves, and carvings made to suggest that each roof is tiled.

This pagoda reflects the influence of the Goryeo wooden architectural style. According to the South Korean Cultural Heritage Administration, this pagoda is one of the finest examples of Korean stone work and is of high artistic value.

== Gallery ==
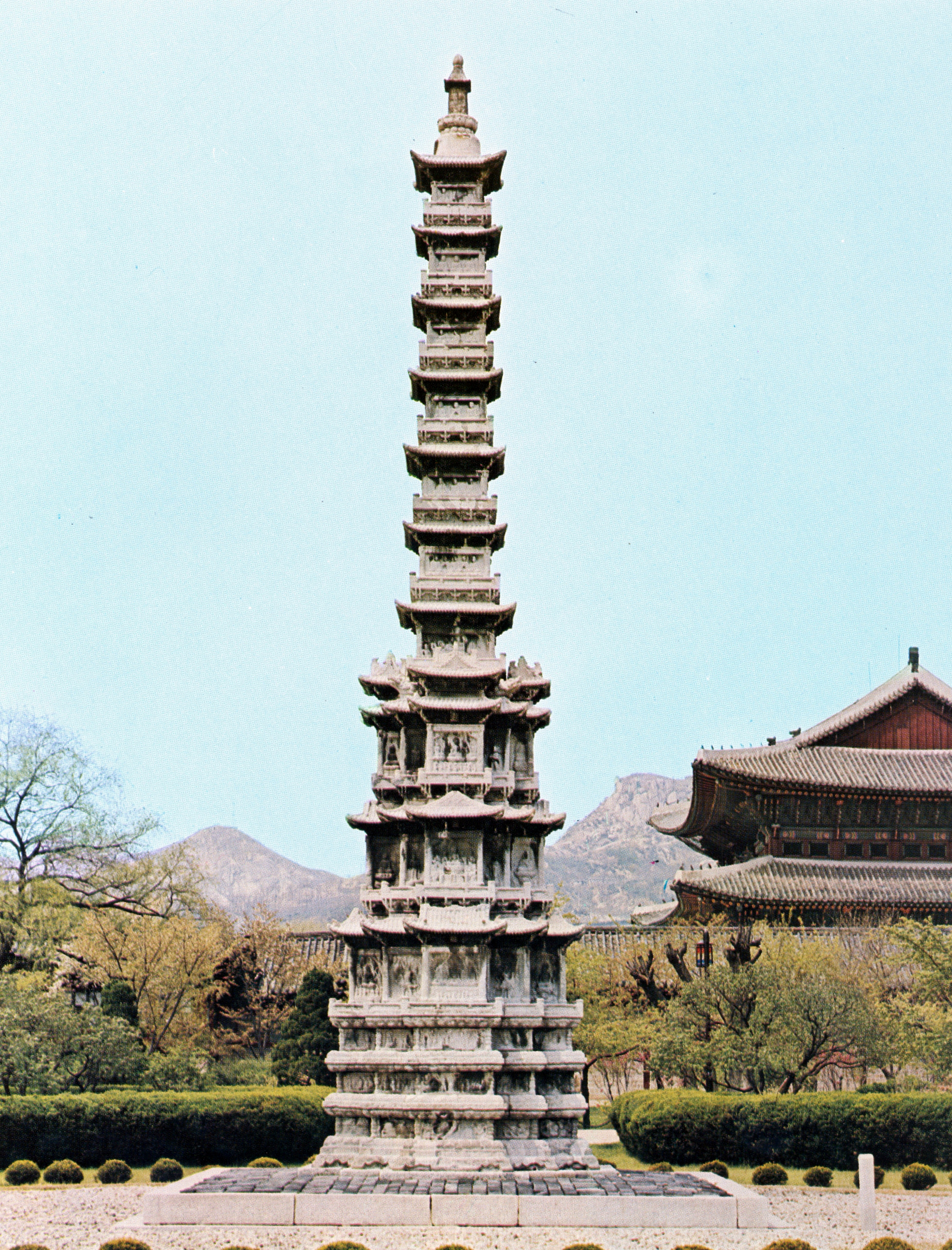

== See also ==
- Wongaksa Pagoda
- National Museum of Korea
- National treasures of South Korea
- National treasures of North Korea
