= National Museum of Korea =

Museum in Seoul, South Korea

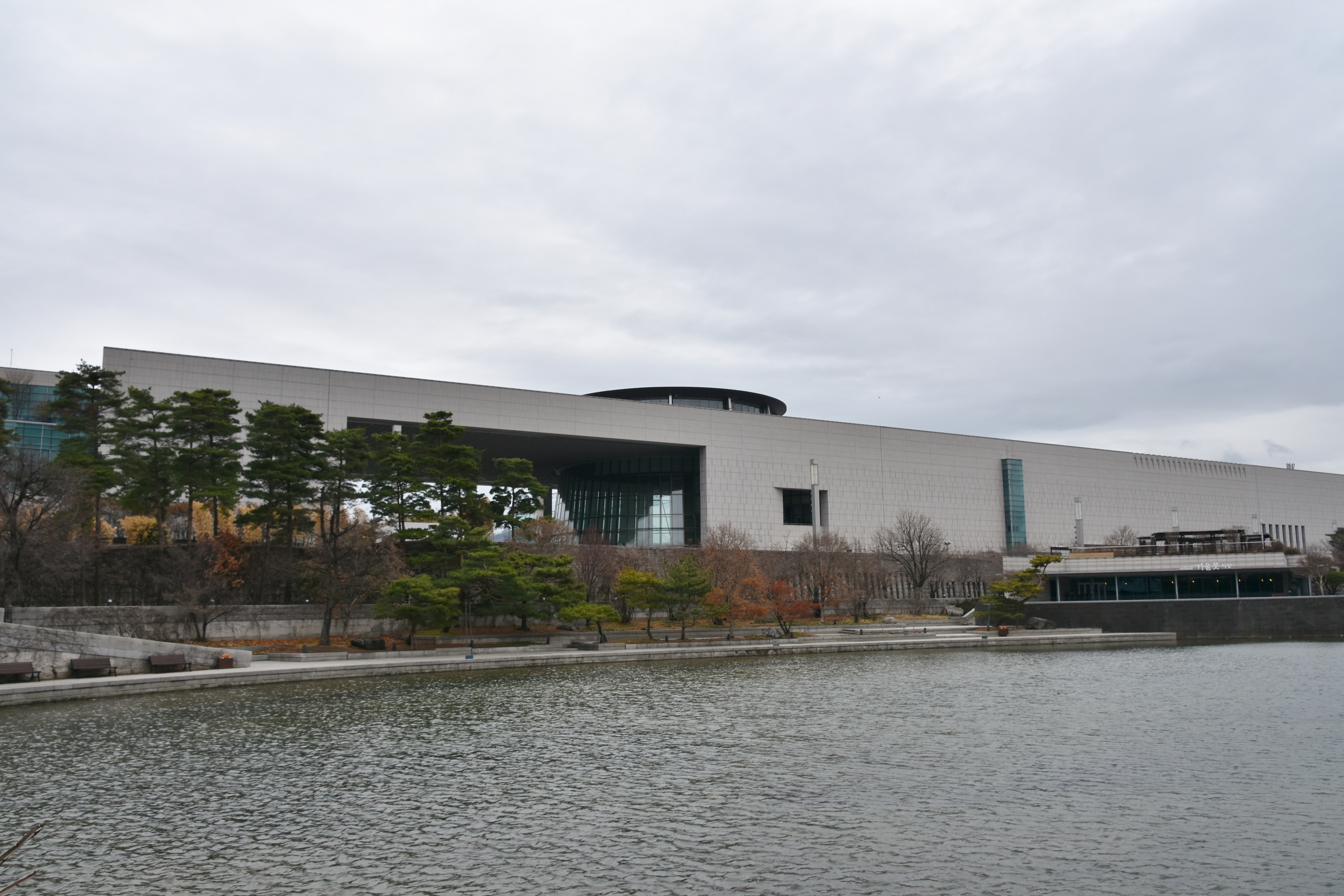
- Front view
- Interactive fullscreen map
- Established: December 3, 1945; 80 years ago
- Location: 137, Seobinggo-ro, Yongsan-gu, Seoul, South Korea
- Coordinates: 37°31′26″N 126°58′49″E
- Type: History and Art museum
- Collection size: over 310,000 pieces 295,551 m^{2} (3.18×10^{6} sq ft)
- Visitors: 3,788,785 (2024)
- President: Yu Hongjun
- Public transit access: Ichon
- Website: museum.go.kr

Korean name
- Hangul: 국립중앙박물관
- Hanja: 國立中央博物館
- RR: Gungnip jungang bangmulgwan
- MR: Kungnip chungang pangmulgwan

The National Museum of Korea (Korean: 국립중앙박물관) is the flagship museum of Korean history and art in South Korea. Since its establishment in 1945, the museum has been committed to various studies and research activities in the fields of archaeology, history, and art, continuously developing a variety of exhibitions and education programs.

It was relocated to Yongsan District, Seoul in 2005. On June 24, 2021, the National Museum of Korea opened a new branch inside Incheon International Airport. Located in the boarding area of the airport in front of Gate No.22, the branch was opened in celebration of the museum's 20th anniversary.

== History ==
Emperor Sunjong established Korea's first museum, the Imperial Household Museum, in 1909. The collections of the Imperial Household Museum at Changgyeonggung and the Japanese Government General Museum administered during Japanese rule of Korea became the nucleus of the National Museum's collection, which was established when South Korea regained independence in 1945.

During the Korean War, the museum's 20,000 pieces were safely moved to Busan to avoid destruction. When the museum returned to Seoul after the war, it was housed at both Gyeongbokgung and Deoksugung Palace. In 1972, the museum moved again to a new building on the grounds of the Gyeonbokgung Palace. The museum was moved again in 1986 to the Jungangcheong, the former Japanese General Government Building, where it was housed (with some controversy and criticism) until the building's demolition in 1995. In December 1996, the museum was opened to the public in temporary accommodations in the renovated Social Education Hall, before officially reopening in its new building in Yongsan Family Park on October 28, 2005.

The museum is situated on what used to be a golf course that was part of the Yongsan Garrison, the central command of the United States Forces stationed in Korea. The US Army returned a part of the land in 1992 to the Korean government, which went on to become the Yongsan Family Park. While the plans for the museum inside the park began in 1993, its opening was delayed repeatedly by a helipad, which was eventually relocated in 2005 by agreement. The museum contains over 310,000 pieces in its collection with about 15,000 pieces on display at one time. It displays relics and artifacts throughout six permanent exhibition galleries such as Prehistory and Ancient History Gallery, Medieval and Early Modern History Gallery, Donation Gallery, Calligraphy and Painting Gallery, Asian Art Gallery, and Sculpture and Crafts Gallery. It is the sixth largest museum in the world in terms of floor space, now covering a total of 295,551 m^{2} (3,180,000 sq ft).

In order to protect the artifacts inside the museum, the main building was built to withstand a magnitude 6.0 Richter Scale earthquake. The display cases are equipped with shock-absorbent platforms. There is also an imported natural lighting system which utilizes sunlight instead of artificial lights and a specially designed air-conditioning system. The museum is made from fire-resistant materials and has special exhibition halls, education facilities, a children's museum, huge outdoor exhibition areas, restaurants, cafes, and shops.

== Layout ==
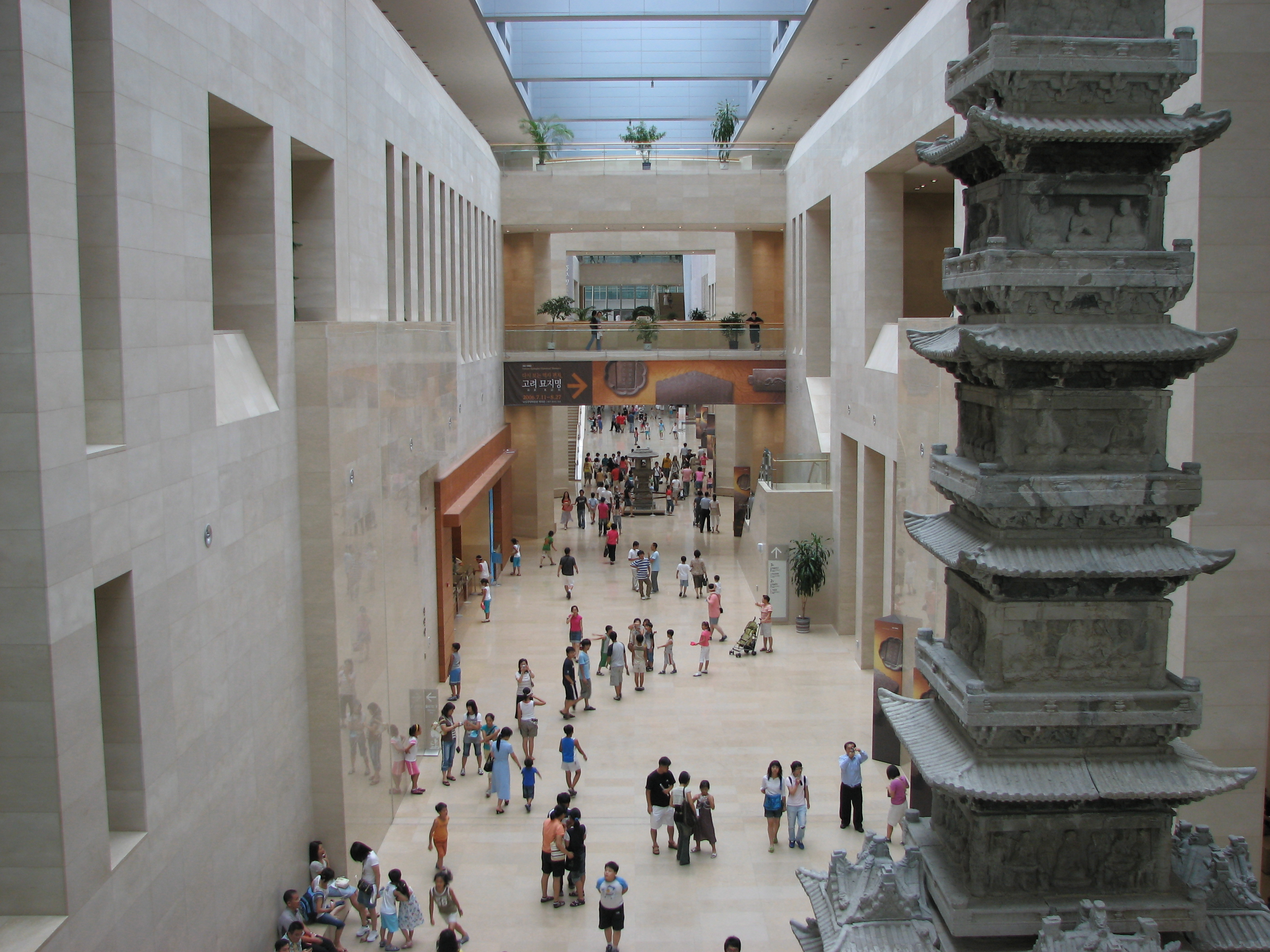
Interior of the museum with Gyeongcheonsa Pagoda

The museum is divided into three floors. Symbolically, the left of the museum is supposed to represent the past, while the right side of the museum represents the future. The ground floor contains parks; gardens of indigenous plants; waterfalls and pools; and a collection of pagodas, stupas, lanterns, and steles (including National Treasure of Korea No. 2, the Great Bell of Bosingak, the exemplar of Korean bells of the Joseon period).

=== First floor ===
On the first floor is the Prehistory and Ancient History Gallery, which contains approximately 4,500 artifacts from the Paleolithic to the Unified Silla era excavated from sites across Korea. The nine exhibition rooms in the gallery are the Palaeolithic Room, the Neolithic Room, the Bronze Age and Gojoseon Room, the Proto Three Kingdoms Room, the Goguryeo Room, the Baekje Room, the Gaya Room, and the Silla Room. Ranging from chipped stone handaxes to luxurious ancient royal ornaments, the relics displayed here show the long journey taken by early settlers on the Peninsula towards developing their unique culture.

Artifacts from important prehistoric sites and settlements such the Bangudae Petroglyphs and Songgung-ni are found in the Neolithic and Bronze Age Rooms.

Also on the first floor is the Medieval and Early Modern History Gallery, which showcases the cultural and historical heritage throughout the Unified Silla, Balhae, Goryeo, and Joseon periods. The eight rooms of the gallery include the Unified Silla Room, Balhae Room, Goryeo Room, and the Joseon Room.

=== Second floor ===
The second floor contains the Donation Gallery and the Calligraphy and Painting Gallery, which contains 890 pieces of art that showcase the traditional and religious arts of Korea in line and color. The Calligraphy and Painting Gallery is divided into four rooms: the Painting Room, the Calligraphy Room, the Buddhist Paintings Room, and the Sarangbang (Scholar's Studio).

The Donation Gallery holds 800 pieces of art donated from the private collections of collectors. The gallery is divided into eleven rooms: the Lee Hong-kun Collection Room, the Kim Chong-hak Collection Room, the Yu Kang-yul Collection Room, the Park Young-sook Collection Room, the Choi Young-do Collection Room, the Park Byong-rae Collection Room, the Yoo Chang-jong Collection Room, the Kaneko Kazushige Collection Room, the Hachiuma Tadasu Collection Room, the Iuchi Isao Collection Room, and the Other Collection Room.

=== Third floor ===
The third floor contains the Sculpture and Crafts Gallery, with 630 pieces that represent Korean Buddhist sculpture and craftwork. Highlights of the gallery include Goryeo Celadon wares and National Treasure of Korea No. 83, Bangasayusang (or Pensive Bodhisattva). The five rooms of the gallery are the Metal Arts Room, the Celadon Room, the Buncheong Ware Room, the White Porcelain Room, and the Buddhist Sculpture Room.

Also on the third floor is the Asian Arts Gallery, which contains 970 pieces that explore the similarities and divergences of Asian art and the confluence of Asian and Western art via the Silk Road. The five rooms are the Indian & Southeast Asian Art Room, the Central Asian Art Room, the Chinese Art Room, the Sinan Undersea Relics Room, and the Japanese Art Room.

== Collection ==
=== Gold Crown, National Treasure of Korea No. 191 ===
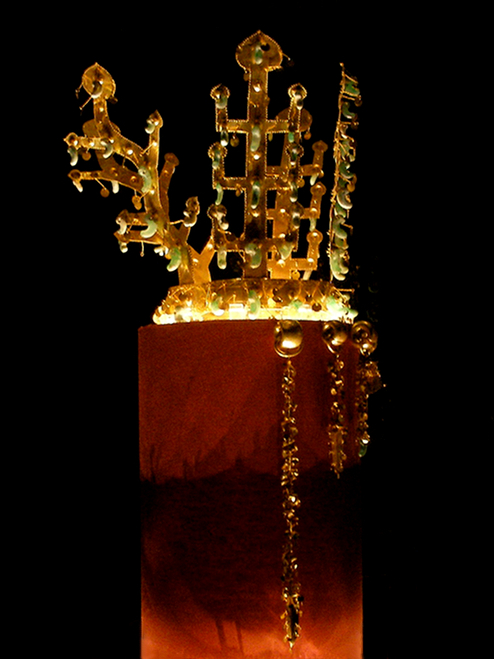
Silla Golden Crown

The Fifth-century Silla gold crown was excavated from the North tomb of Hwangnamdaechong in Gyeongju. More ornaments, including a silver belt ornament inscribed (보인대)'Buindae ("Madame's belt"), were found in the North tomb than in the South tomb, suggesting that the North tomb is a woman's. The gold crown reflects the owner's political and social class.

=== Pensive Bodhisattva ===
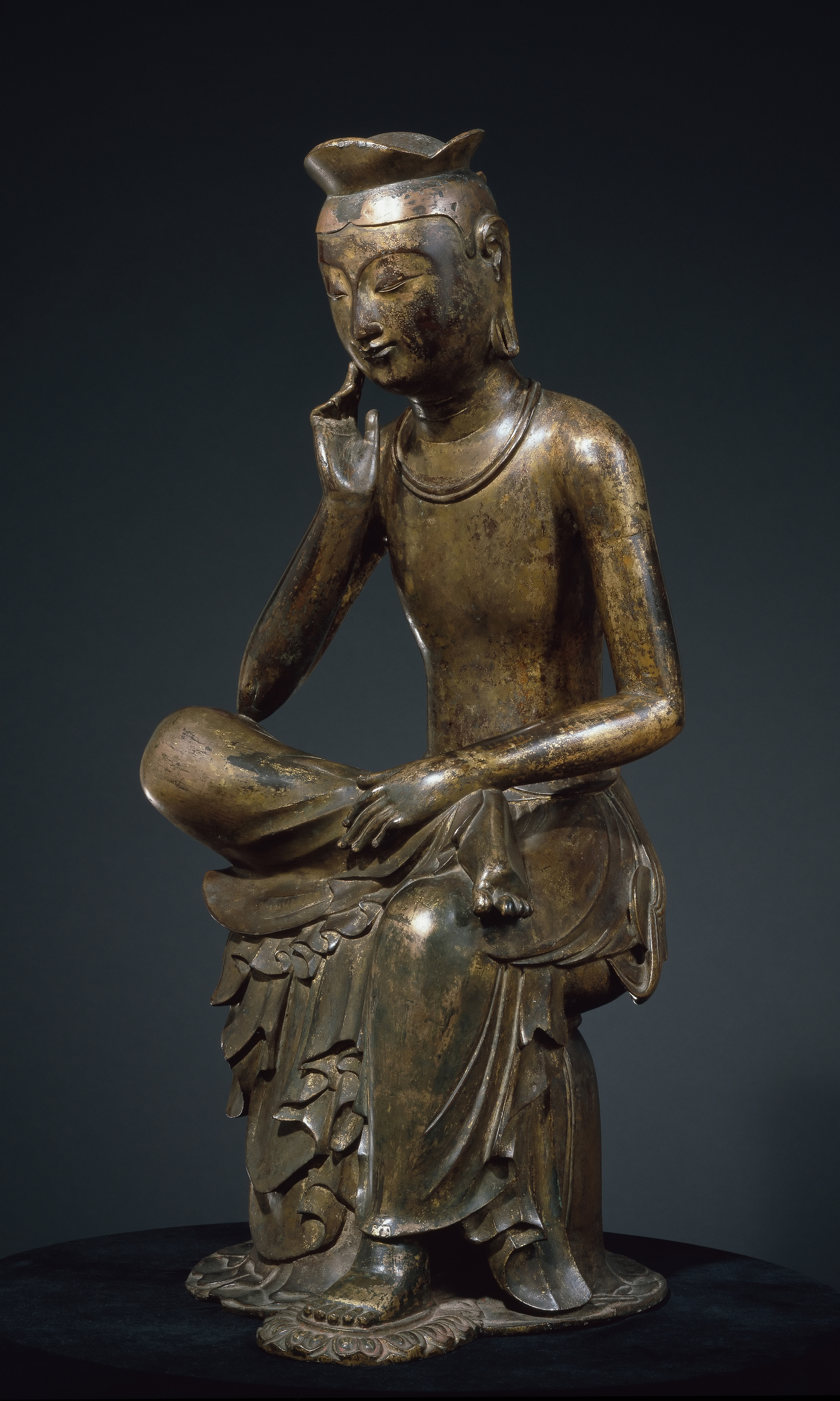
Pensive Bodhisattva

This Bodhisattva, from the early Seventh-century, sits with one leg over the other, lost in thought with fingers on its cheeks. The pose is derived from that of the Buddha contemplating the life of human beings. This statue wears a flat crown called the 'Three Mountain Crown' or 'Lotus Crown.' The torso is naked, adorned by a simple necklace. There are remarkable similarities with the wooden Pensive Bodhisattva at the Koryuji Temple in Kyoto, Japan, which is believed to have been founded by a Silla monk. It is likely, then, that this statue was created in Silla. The well-balanced shape, however, and elegant and refined craftsmanship is typical of the Baekje period.

=== Incense Burner, Celadon with Openwork, National Treasure of Korea No. 95 ===
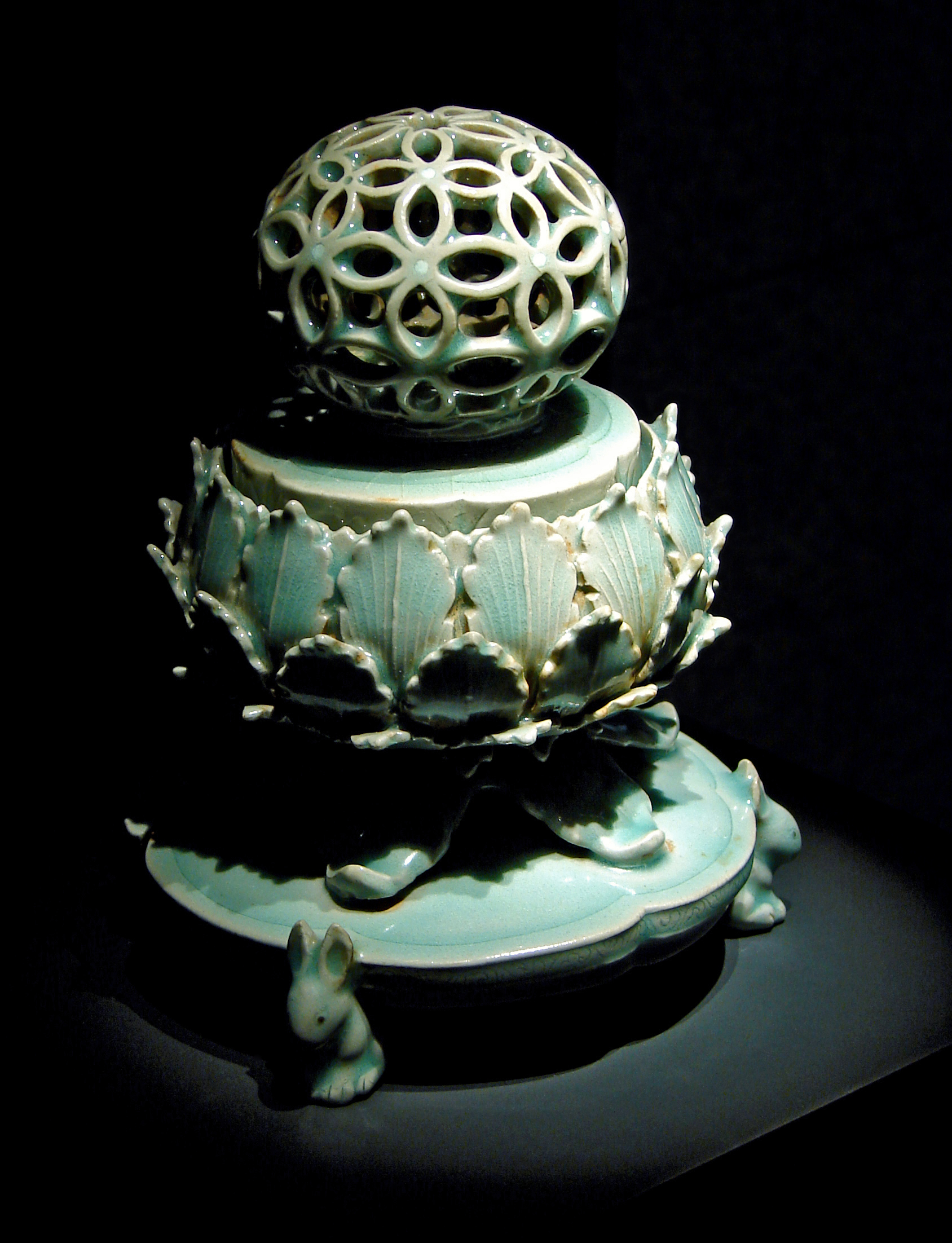
Celadon Openwork Incense Burner

This Twelfth-century incense burner represents some of the best quality Goryeo celadon. It is composed of a cover (with a central hole for releasing incense), a burner, and a support. Above the hole for incense is a curved knob with a Seven Treasure design incised to aid the release of scent.

=== Ten-Story Pagoda from Gyeongcheonsa Temple, National Treasure of Korea No. 86 ===
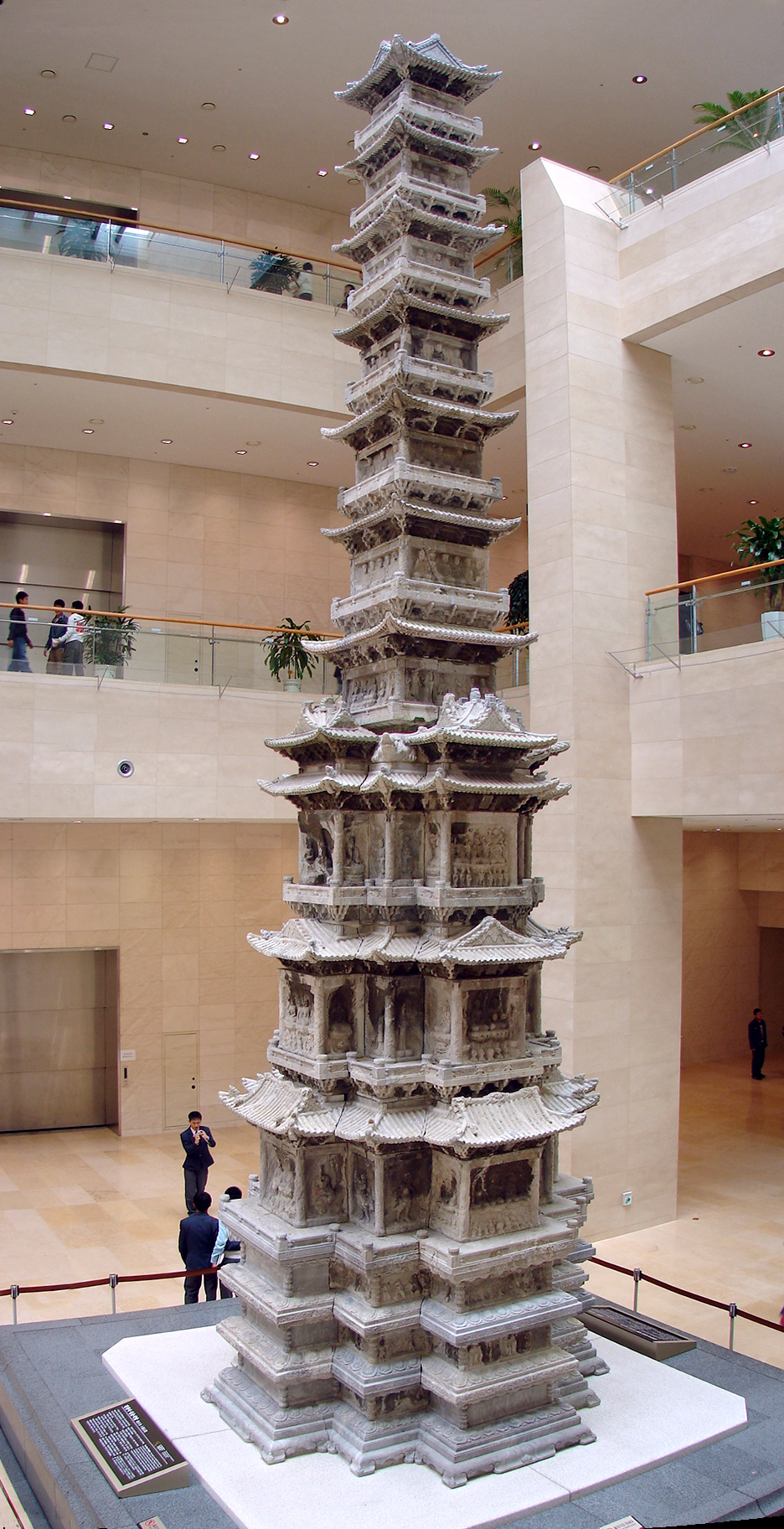
Ten-Story Pagoda

The "Gyeongcheonsa Ten-Story Pagoda" (경천사 십층석탑; 敬天寺十層石塔) was originally erected at the monastery Gyeongcheonsa in the fourth year (1348) of King Chungmok of Goryeo. In 1907, it was illegally smuggled to Japan by a Japanese court official, but was returned in 1918 at the behest of British and American journalists, E. Bethell and H. Hulbert. In 1960, it was restored to Gyoengbokgung Palace, but proved difficult to conserve because of acid rain and weathering. So, it was dismantled again in 1995, to be housed inside in the National Museum of Korea's 'Path to History' when the museum reopened in 2005.

=== Album of Genre Painting by Danwon, Treasure of Korea No. 527 ===
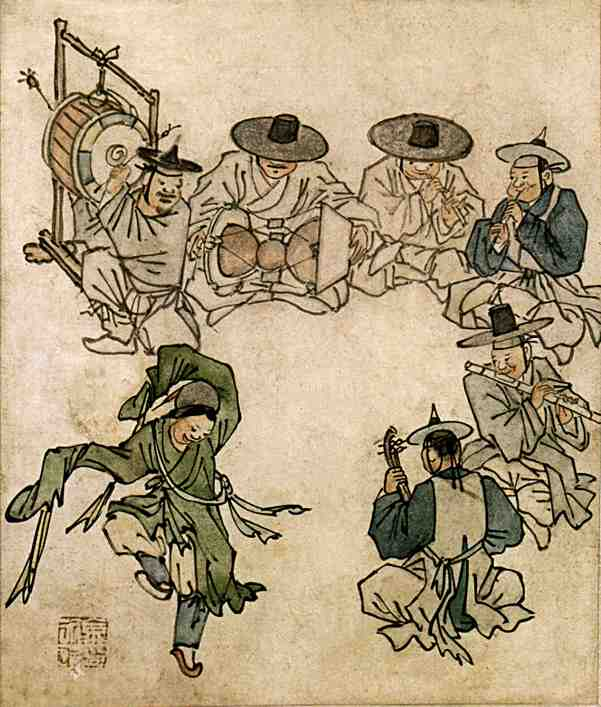
Dancing Boy by Danwon

The 18th-century painter Kim Hong-do, also known as Danwon, is known for his humorous and candid paintings of the lives of common people. This album consists of twenty-five paintings, each focusing on figures without background features. Kim's paintings appear sketchy, yet show expressive brush strokes and balanced composition. It is presumed that this style arose in Kim's late 30s, the album being completed when he was about 40 years old.

=== Comb-pattern pottery ===
the comb-pattern pottery of Korea in the National Museum of Korea

Comb-patterned pottery is a type of vessel used in Korea’s Neolithic period.It is presumed to have been used mainly for storing or transporting food. Previously, different patterns decorated each surface of the vessels, but from this period onward pottery with simple patterns were found. In particular, the comb-patterned pottery found around the Han River, exhibited at the National Museum of Korea, is engraved with patterns resembling fish bones. Also, there are two holes at the bottom of the pottery, and people who saw them can infer that broken pottery was temporarily repaired and used, and that there must have been artisans who made pottery.

=== The Oegyujanggak Uigwe ===
Gyujanggak was a royal library established on the grounds of Changdeokgung Palace in the capital by order of King Jeongjo, the 22nd ruler of the Joseon, in 1776. Over time, the library also developed into a state-sponsored research institution. In 1782, a royal library annex called Oegyujanggak was established on Gangwha Island to preserve important documents related to the royal family more systematically and securely than possible in the capital. Oegyujanggak housed copies of writings, calligraphy, and drawings by former kings as well as the royal genealogies, uigwe, and other such items. As such it was a repository of royal family culture. It includes records of the preparations for state-sponsored events and ceremonies involving key members of the Joseon royal family. The text explains every process in detail and is supported by illustrations elaborately drawn by hand. These served as references for later generations organizing similar ceremonies or events. The Uigwe began to be produced in the 15th century, during early Joseon, and the practice continued to the end of the kingdom in the early 20th century. They preserve core elements of Confucian culture, which revered ritual and propriety. These works also show the governing philosophy and systems by which the Joseon state was run. Their historical and cultural value has been recognized globally, as the "Royal Protocols of Joseon Dynasty"* were inscribed into the UNESCO Memory of the World Register in 2007.

Two hundred and ninety-seven volumes of the Protocols that were looted in 1866 during the French campaign against Korea were kept at the Bibliothèque nationale de France. In 1975, Dr. Park Byung-sun, who was working as a contract employee at the National Library of France, discovered that the library held books from the Joseon Dynasty. She organized the Protocols, and their existence became known.

During the Korea-France summit in September 1993, French President François Mitterrand, aiming to secure the TGV contract for the construction of the Gyeongbu high-speed railway, brought one volume of the "Huigyeongwonweonsodogam Uigwe" to demonstrate his intention to return the Oegyujanggak books. However, contrary to the promise, the Oegyujanggak books were not returned.

In October 2000, at another summit between the two countries, they agreed to return 63 volumes, which had no handwritten copies in Korea, in the form of a "reciprocal cultural heritage exchange exhibition" by 2001. However, the return negotiations were either postponed or delayed by the French side, which showed a passive attitude. Additionally, within Korea, historical, academic, and civic organizations were expanding their movement for the return of the Oegyujanggak books, insisting on unconditional repatriation, even by appealing to the International Court of Justice.

The issue remained unresolved. However, during the G20 Summit on November 12, 2010, the presidents of both countries agreed to lend the Oegyujanggak books to Korea on a renewable five-year lease.

After 145 years, they were repatriated in April and June 2011 in four separate installments.

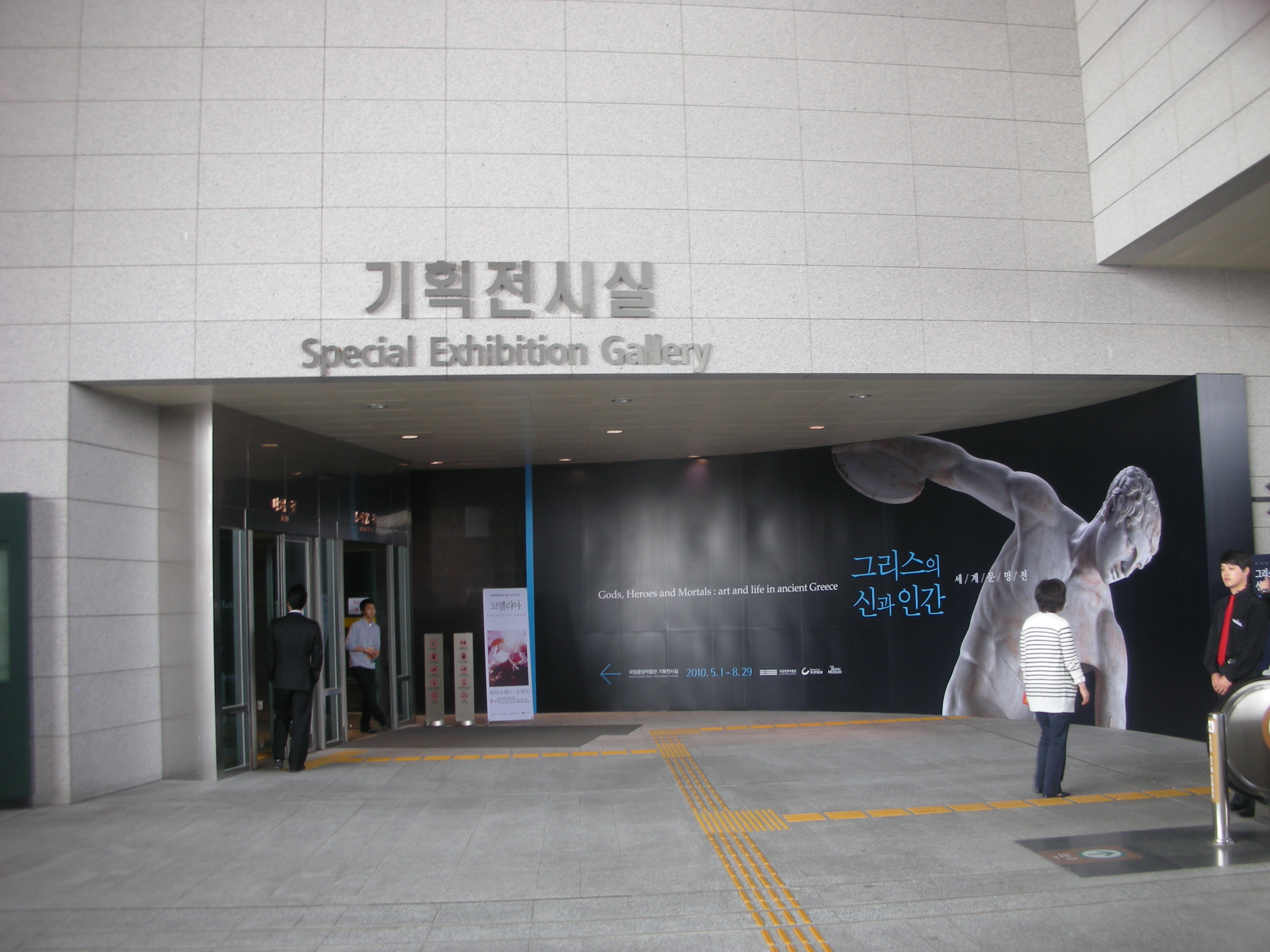
Special Exhibition Hall

A special exhibition, The Return of the Oegyujanggak Uigwe from France: Records of the State Rites of the Joseon Dynasty, was held from 19 July to 18 September 2011. In June 2011, before of the exhibition, the museum showcased five copies of the records to the media, along with the silk covers of other volumes.

== See also ==
- Ministry of Culture, Sports and Tourism
